= BSOD (disambiguation) =

BSOD, BSoD, Bsod, may refer to:

== Technology ==
- Blue screen of death, a type of error message found on computers
- Black screen of death, a type of error message found on computers

== People ==
- Bsod-rgyal (Tibetan: བསོད་རྒྱལ་; 1947–2019), a Dzogchen lama
- bSod-nams (Tibetan: བསོད་ནམས; died 1776), a lord-lama, a rGyalrong chieftain
- bsod-nams-rgya-mtsho (Tibetan: བསོད་ནམས་རྒྱ་མཚོ་; 1543–1588), the first named Dalai Lama, the third chronological Dalai Lama
- Black Son of Darkness, main pseudonym for German Black metalist Andreas Bettinger

== Other uses ==
- "B.S.O.D." (episode), 2016 season 5 episode 1 of the TV show Person of Interest
- B.S./O.D. (also BS/OD, BS-OD, BSOD), a joint degree program providing graduates with bachelor of science and doctor of optometry diploma, frequently a 7-year university program; as post-nominal letters, it signifies doctor of optometry
