= Guru Meditation =

Error notice displayed by the Amiga computer

Guru Meditation is an error notice originally displayed by the Amiga computer when it crashes. It is analogous to the "Blue Screen of Death" in Microsoft Windows operating systems, or a kernel panic in Unix.

It has also been used as a message for unrecoverable errors in software packages such as VirtualBox and other operating systems (see Legacy section below).

== Origins ==
The term "Guru Meditation Error" originated as an in-house joke in Amiga's early days. The company had a product called the Joyboard for the Atari 2600 home video game console, a game controller much like a joystick but operated by the feet, similar to the Wii Balance Board. Early in the development of the Amiga computer operating system, the company's developers became so frustrated with the system's frequent crashes that, as a relaxation technique, a game was developed where a person would sit cross-legged on the Joyboard, resembling an Indian guru. The player tried to remain extremely still; the winner was the player who stayed still the longest. If the player moved too much, a "guru meditation" error occurred.

== Description of "Guru Meditation" errors on the Amiga ==
The alert occurred when there was a fatal problem with the system. If the system had no means of recovery, it could display the alert, even in systems with numerous critical flaws. In extreme cases, the alert could even be displayed if the system's memory was completely exhausted.

The text of the alert messages was completely baffling to most users. Only highly technically adept Amiga users would know, for example, that exception 3 was an address error, and meant the program was accessing a word on an unaligned boundary. Users without this specialized knowledge would have no recourse but to look for a "Guru" or to simply reboot the machine and hope for the best.

== Technical description (Amiga) ==
When a Guru Meditation is displayed, the options are to reboot by pressing the left mouse button, or to invoke ROMWack by pressing the right mouse button or to manually reboot. ROMWack is a minimalist debugger built into the operating system which is accessible by connecting a 9600 baud terminal to the serial port.

Simulation of the Guru Meditation error message

Simulation of the Recoverable Alert message

The alert itself appears as a black rectangular box located in the upper portion of the screen. Its border and text are red for a normal Guru Meditation, or green/yellow for a Recoverable Alert, another kind of Guru Meditation. The screen may go black, but the power LEDs always alternates between full and half-brightness for a few seconds before the alert appears. In AmigaOS 1.x, programmed in ROMs known as Kickstart 1.1, 1.2 and 1.3, the errors are always red. In AmigaOS 2.x and 3.x, recoverable alerts are yellow, except for some very early versions of 2.x where they were green.

Dead-end alerts are always red and terminal in all OS versions except in a rare series of events, as in when a deprecated Kickstart (example: 1.1) program conditionally boots from disk on a more advanced Kickstart 3.x ROM Amiga running in compatibility mode (therefore eschewing the on-disk OS) and crashes with a red Guru Meditation but subsequently restores itself by pressing the left mouse button, the newer Kickstart recognizing an inadvised low level chipset call for the older ROM directly poking the hardware, and addressing it.

The error is displayed as two fields, separated by a period. The format is #0000000x.yyyyyyyy in case of a CPU error, or #aabbcccc.dddddddd in case of a system software error. The first field is either the Motorola 68000 exception number that occurred (if a CPU error occurs) or an internal error identifier (such as an "Out of Memory" code), in case of a system software error. The second can be the address of a Task structure, or the address of a memory block whose allocation or deallocation failed. It is never the address of the code that caused the error. If the cause of the crash is uncertain, this number is rendered as 48454C50, which stands for "HELP" in hexadecimal ASCII characters (48=H, 45=E, 4C=L, 50=P).

=== Guru Meditation handler ===
There was a commercially available error handler for AmigaOS, before version 2.04, called GOMF (Get Outta My Face) made by Hypertek/Silicon Springs Development corp. It was able to deal with many kinds of errors and gave the user a choice to either remove the offending process and associated screen, or allow the machine to show the Guru Meditation. In many cases, removal of the offending process gave one the choice to save one's data and exit running programs before rebooting the system. When the damage was not extensive, one was able to continue using the machine. However, it did not save the user from all errors, as one may have still seen this error occasionally.

Guru Meditation error in VirtualBox

=== Recoverable Alerts ===
Recoverable Alerts are non-critical crashes in the computer system. In most cases, it is possible to resume work and save files after a Recoverable Alert, while a normal, red Guru Meditation always results in an immediate reboot.

It is, however, still recommended to reboot as soon as possible after encountering a Recoverable Alert, because the system may be in an unpredictable state that can cause data corruption.

=== System software error codes ===
The first byte specifies the area of the system affected. The top bit will be set if the error is a dead end alert.

Area of system	Value	Specific part of system
Libraries	01	Exec library
Libraries	02	Graphics library
Libraries	03	Layers library
Libraries	04	Intuition library
Libraries	05	Math library
Libraries	06	CList library
Libraries	07	AmigaDOS library
Libraries	08	RAM Handler library
Libraries	09	Icons library
Devices	10	Audio device
Devices	11	Console device
Devices	12	Gameport device
Devices	13	Keyboard device
Devices	14	Trackdisk device
Devices	15	Timer device
Resources	20	CIA resource
Resources	21	Disk resource
Resources	22	Misc resource
Other areas	30	Bootstrap
Other areas	31	Workbench
Other areas	32	Diskcopy

== Legacy ==
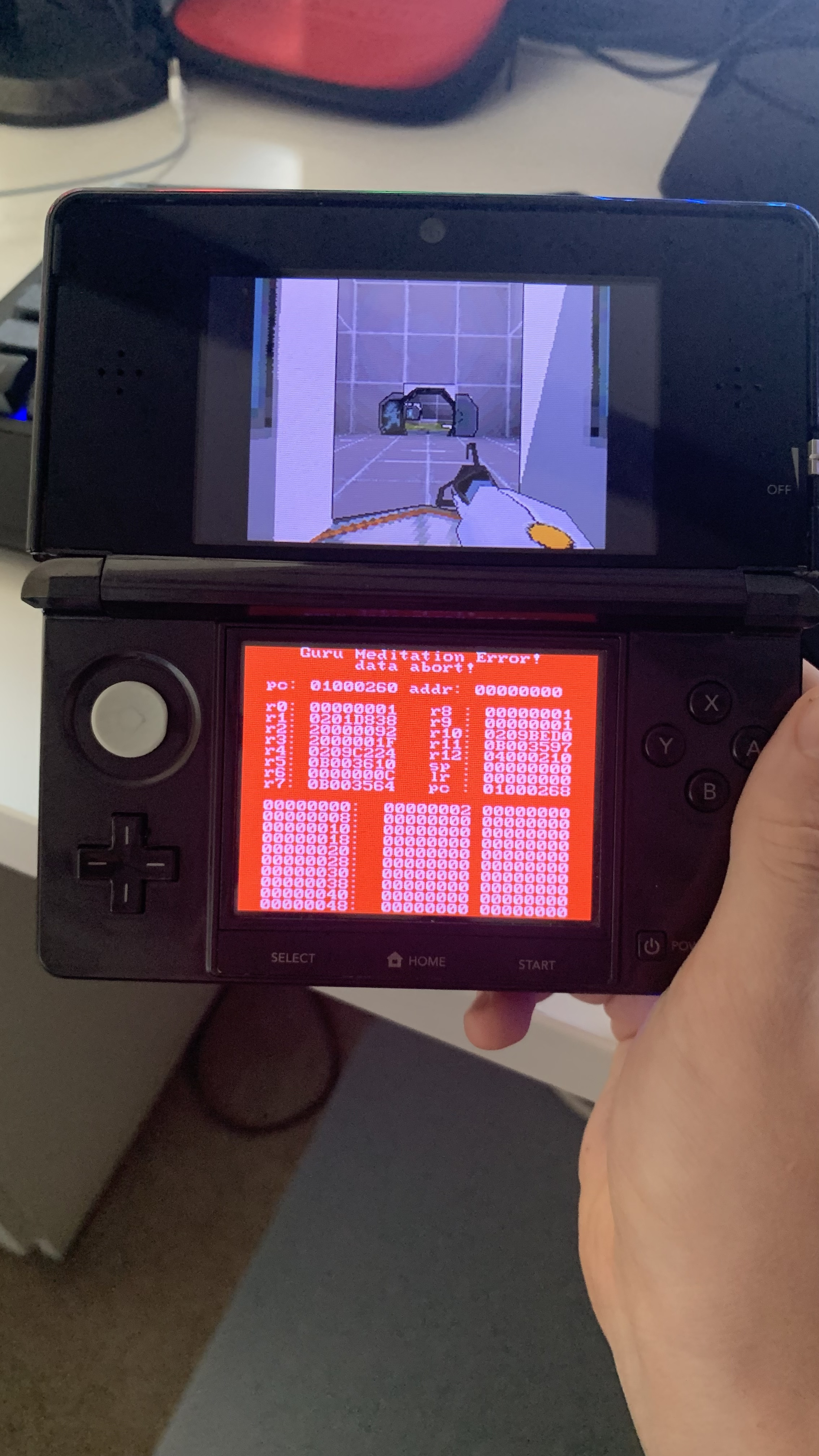
Guru Meditation on a 3DS playing a homebrew DS version of Portal

- AmigaOS versions 4.0 and onwards replaced "Guru Meditation" with "Grim Reaper", but briefly mentions the Guru Meditation number in the prompt box.
- MorphOS displays an "Application Is Meditating" error message. Attempting to close the application may revive the operating system, but restarting is still recommended.
- Varnish references Guru Meditation for severe errors.
- The ESP8266 and ESP32 microcontrollers will display "Guru Meditation Error: Core X panic'ed" (where X is 0 or 1 depending on which core crashed) along with a core dump and stack trace.
- VirtualBox uses the term "Guru Meditation" for severe errors in the virtual machine monitor, for example caused by a triple fault in the virtual machine.
- E23 displays a "Guru Meditation" and restarts when severe errors occur.
- Some Nintendo DS homebrew titles display a "Guru Meditation" error when an issue occurs, likely when the title crashes.
- OpenMediaVault has Guru Meditation-like errors (such as with session timeouts) as well as emulating the Amiga's pointer and wait pointer (when executing a task) in the web interface.

== See also ==
- Screen of death
