= Macintosh startup =

Startup sequence for Macintosh computers

The startup sequence for Apple's Macintosh (or Mac) computers includes hardware tests and diagnostics which can trigger the startup chimes, or other instances of success or failure or both of the startup routines.

The startup sequence provides auditory and visual symbols of the computer's status and condition as it powers up, providing users with immediate feedback on the machine's soundness. Additionally, they allow the user to quickly identify any potential problems and take any appropriate actions to rectify faults.

== Startup process ==
Two Mac computers, Old World ROM and UEFI respectively, in the process of starting up with different styles

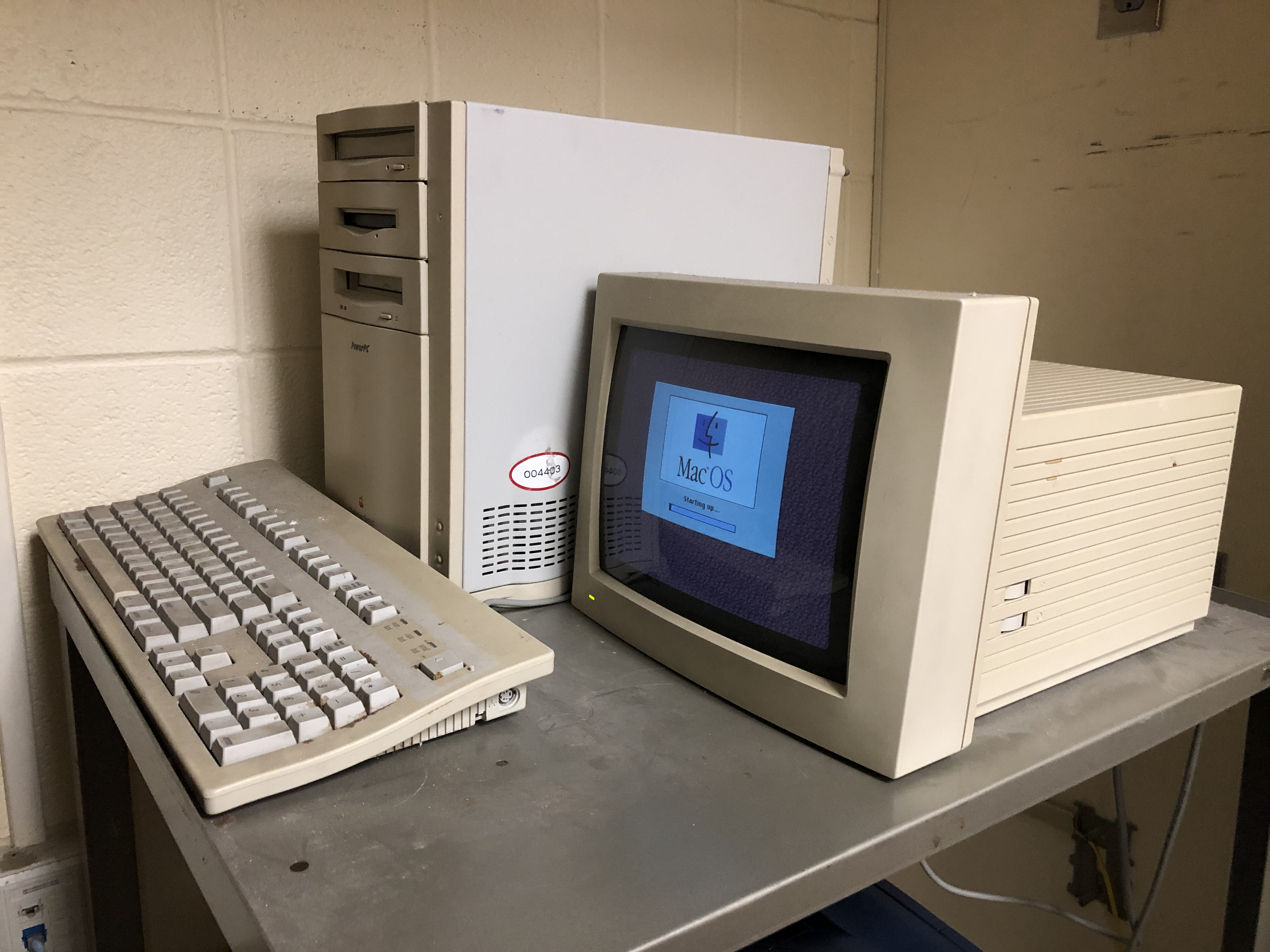
A Workgroup Server 8150 at Bowling Green State University starting up with a "Mac OS" loading screen

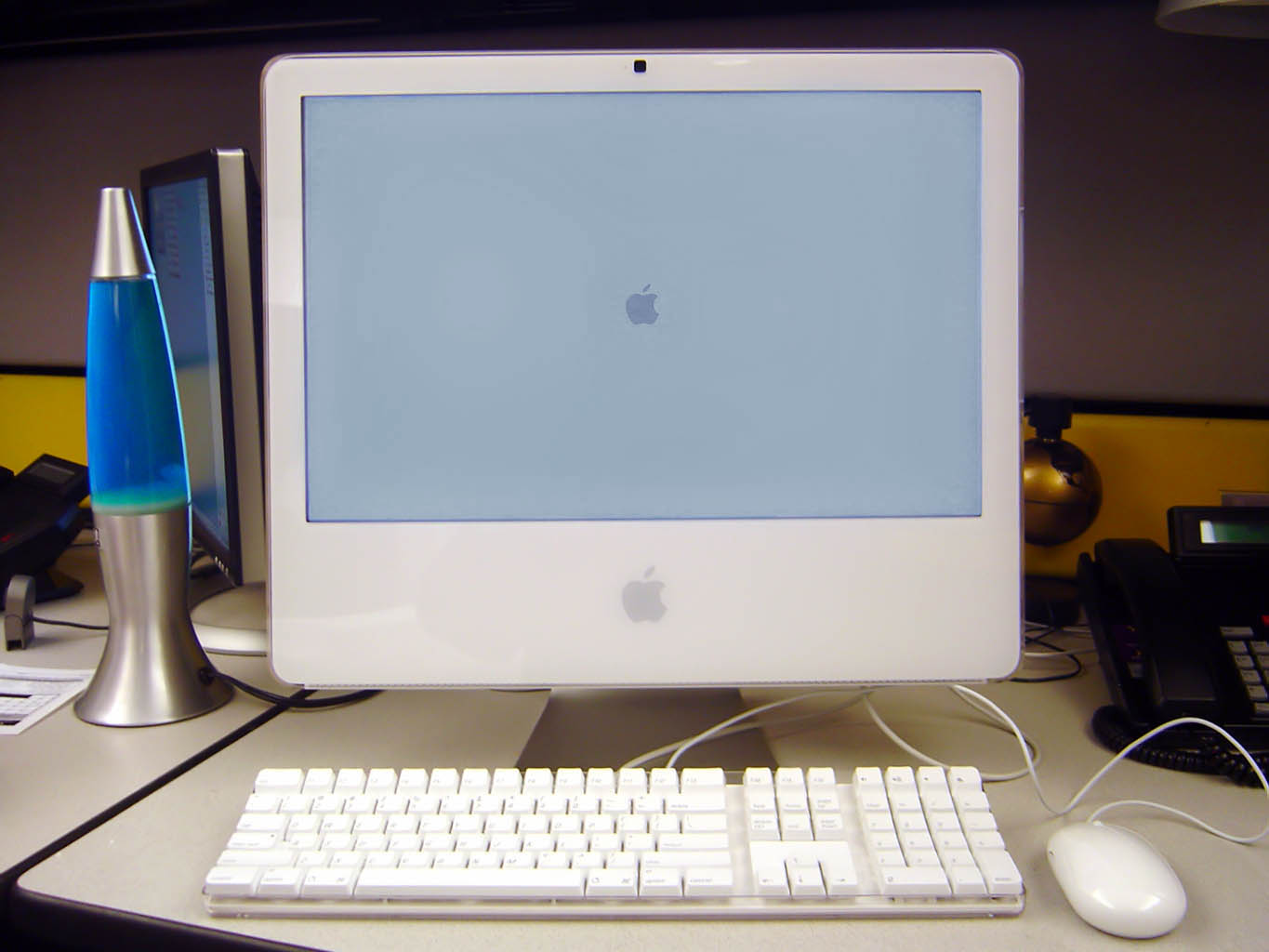
A 2006 iMac displaying a dark gray Apple logo on a light gray background upon startup

Macs made from 1984 to 1998 used Old World ROM as the boot loader for all Macs produced around that time period. From 1998 up until the PowerPC to Intel transition, New World ROM was used for all Macs starting with the first iMac and later expanding to the first iBook and the Blue and White Power Mac G3. BootX is used as the boot loader for macOS on Old World/New World Macs. Most Intel-based Macs used Apple's implementation of UEFI as the boot loader, while those with a T2 security chip used a slightly different approach where it verifies the digital signature of the UEFI firmware via the security chip, which will then load the firmware upon successful verification. All Apple silicon-based Macs use a newer method separate from previous Macs where it uses a boot ROM located on the SoC to launch iBoot, in a similar manner to that of the iPhone and iPad.

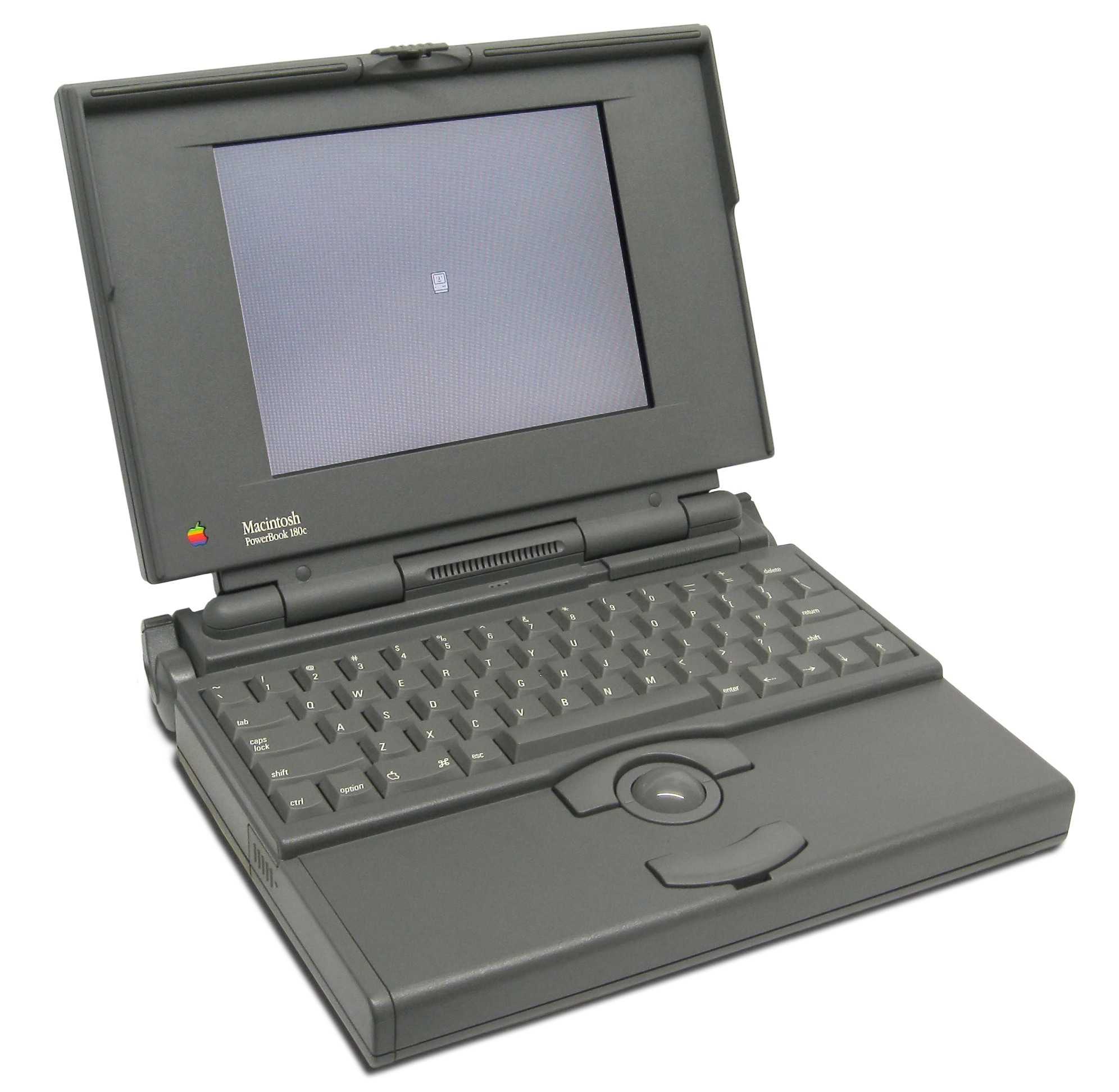
An Apple PowerBook 180c displaying the Happy Mac during the startup process

In all instances, the startup chimes will be heard upon completion of the boot process (if successful), and a Happy Mac (or the Apple logo on newer versions) will be displayed on the screen to visually indicate that no hardware issues were found during the boot process. On the other hand, a failure to do so will result in a different outcome where a different sound will be heard in place of the startup chime. This would either be the Chimes of Death (for most Old World ROM Macs made from 1987 to 1998) or a series of simple beep codes (for Macs made from 1998 onwards). In addition, a Sad Mac with either one or two lines of hexadecimal codes will be displayed on some Old World ROM machines to visually indicate a hardware issue during the boot process.

All Macs made from 2016 to 2020 have the startup chimes disabled by default, however, it was later re-enabled on those Macs running macOS Big Sur or later; this can be disabled by the user within System Preferences (Big Sur up to Monterey) or System Settings (Ventura and later).

== Startup chime ==
The startup chime heard on all Macintosh models made from 1998 to 2016. A slightly modified variant is heard on all Macintosh models from 2013 and later with the release of macOS Big Sur in 2020.

The Macintosh startup chime is played on power-up, before booting into an operating system. The sound indicates that diagnostic tests were run immediately at startup and have found no hardware or fundamental software problems. The specific sound differs depending on the ROM, which greatly varies depending on Macintosh model. For models built prior to the introduction of the Power Macintosh in 1994, the failure of initial self-diagnostic tests results in a Sad Mac icon, an error code, and (later) the distinctive Chimes of Death sounds.

The startup chime used in the first three Macintosh models is a simple square-wave "beep" generated at 600 Hz that was programmed in software by Andy Hertzfeld, utilizing the computers' onboard MOS 6522 VIA chip. All subsequent sounds after it are various chords. Software engineer Mark Lentczner used the Apple Sound Chip, his innovation of sound for the Macintosh, to play the C major fourth chord used in the Macintosh II that was programmed in software. Variations of this sound were employed until Apple sound designer Jim Reekes created the startup chime used in the Quadra 700 through the Quadra 800. Reekes said, "The startup sound was done in my home studio on a Korg Wavestation EX. It's a C major chord, played with both hands stretched out as wide as possible (with 3rd at the top, if I recall)." He created the sound as he was annoyed with the tri-tone startup chimes because they were too associated with the death chimes and the computer crashes. He recalls that Apple did not give him permission to change the sound and that he secretly snuck the sound into the computers with the help of engineers who were in charge of the ROM chips. When Apple discovered this, he refused to change it, using various claims in order to keep the sound intact. He is also the creator of the iconic (or "earconic", as he calls it) "bong" startup chime used in most Macintoshes since the Quadra 840AV. It was created with multiple synthesizers, one of them being Reekes' Wavestation using a modified version of the "Sandman" preset and another being an Oberheim Matrix-6. A slightly lower-pitched version of this chime is used in all PCI-based Power Macs until the iMac G3. On the other hand, the Macintosh LC, LC II, and Macintosh Classic II do not use the Reekes chime, instead using a software-programmed F major fifth chord that simply produces a "ding" sound. The first generation Power Macintosh computers also do not use the Reekes chime, instead using a chord strummed by jazz guitarist Stanley Jordan on an Ovation (sometimes incorrectly attributed as a Yamaha in some sources) steel-string acoustic guitar using the finger tapping technique. Furthermore, the Power Macintosh 5200–6300 computers use a unique chime (excluding the 5400 and 5500, which uses the same "bong" chime used in all PCI-based Power Macs) that was composed on the Fairlight CMI, which is also used in television commercials for the Power Macintosh and PowerBook series from 1995 until 1998. The 20th Anniversary Macintosh uses another unique chime, which was also composed on a Korg Wavestation using a modified version of a preset found on one of its sound expansion cards.

The chime used for all Mac computers from 1998 to early 2016 is the same chime that was first introduced in the iMac G3. It was produced by pitch-shifting the 840AV's startup chime, making it an F♯ major chord. Since 2012, the Mac startup chime has been a registered trademark in the United States, and is also featured in the 2008 Pixar film WALL-E when the titular robot character is fully recharged by solar panels as well as in the 2007 Brad Paisley song "Online".

Starting with the 2016 MacBook Pro, all new Macs were shipped without a startup chime, with the Macs silently booting when powered on. The startup chime would later be added to these models (and all subsequent models since) with the release of macOS Big Sur in 2020, which can be enabled or disabled in System Preferences. The new startup chime introduced with Big Sur is similar to the previous chime except it was pitch-shifted down one semitone, producing an F major chord instead of an F♯ one. The sound mixing of the new startup chime is also noticeably different from that of the previous chime. Prior to Big Sur's release, a similar-sounding variant of this startup chime was used during the "Simplicity Shootout" commercial shown at the iMac G3's introduction in 1998. Initially, the new startup chime from Big Sur was only used on Intel-based Macs equipped with a T2 security chip, with most other Macs at the time (including older ones) still using the previous chime (even when upgraded to Big Sur prior to the 2020 Mojave and Catalina security updates). Eventually, the new startup chime was brought over to all older supported Macs starting with the macOS Big Sur 11.0.1 beta, and a firmware update included in the macOS Catalina 2020-001 Security Update and the macOS Mojave 2020-007 Security Update brought the new startup chime in Big Sur to all Macs that support Big Sur, including the Late 2013 iMac (despite not officially supported by Apple to run Big Sur).

== Happy Mac and Apple logo ==
A small, rectangular icon depicting a gray computer emblazoned with a colourful Apple logo, and a floppy-disk slot. On its small square screen is a smiley-face emoticon against a lilac background. The icon indicates that the machine has successfully begun booting, in contrast to a "Sad Mac" icon, which displays a "sad" emoticon.

The splash screen under Mac OS 8

The "Welcome to Macintosh" screen seen in System 7.5 and earlier

A Happy Mac is the normal bootup (startup) icon of an Apple Macintosh computer running older versions of the Mac operating system. It was designed by Susan Kare in the 1980s, drawing inspiration from the design of the Compact Macintosh series and from the Batman character Two-Face. The logo also shares some similarities to the faces of the 1934 painting Deux personnages (Two Characters) by Pablo Picasso and to the Bauhaus emblem. The icon remained unchanged for many years until it and its related icons were updated to 8-bit color by Lauralee Alben in the 1990s.

The Happy Mac indicates that booting has successfully begun, while a Sad Mac (along with a "Chimes of Death" melody or one or more beeps) indicates a hardware or software problem. When a Macintosh boots into the classic Mac OS (Mac OS 9 or lower), the system will play its startup chime, and the screen will turn gray. The Happy Mac icon will appear, followed by the "Welcome to Mac OS" splash screen (or the small "Welcome to Macintosh" window in System 7.5 and earlier), which underwent several stylistic changes, the other significant ones being the inclusion of extension icons appearing in the bottom left as well as a progress bar that was introduced in System 7.5. Mac OS 8.6 and later include the version number in the splash screen (for example, "Mac OS 9" in big black text).

On early Macs without an internal hard drive, the computer boots up to a point where it needs to load the operating system from a floppy disk. The Mac displays a floppy disk icon with a blinking question mark until the user inserts the correct disk. In New World ROM Macs, a folder icon with a question mark that repeatedly changes to the Finder icon is shown if a System Folder or boot loader file cannot be found on the startup disk.

With the introduction of Mac OS X, the Happy Mac icon was retained for the two initial versions of the operating system, beginning with Mac OS X 10.0. A new Happy Mac was introduced in Mac OS X 10.1, which looked largely identical to that found in previous Classic Mac OS operating systems with some minor changes. This is also the last version of Mac OS as a whole (both Classic Mac OS and Mac OS X) to use the Happy Mac icon.

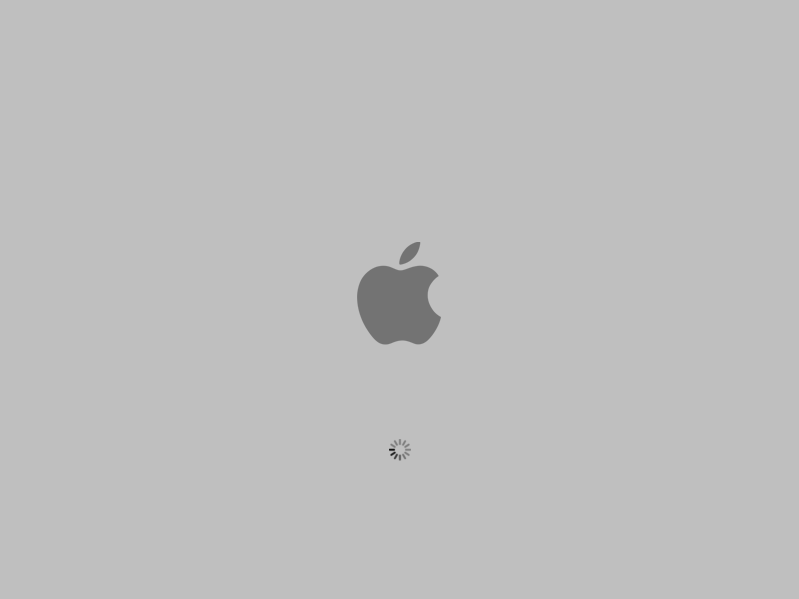
The Mac OS X startup screen from versions 10.2 to 10.9, displaying a dark-gray Apple logo on a lighter gray-white background as well as a loading throbber

In 2002, with the release of version 10.2, the Happy Mac symbol was retired and replaced with the Apple logo. Also, in addition to the blinking system folder icon, a prohibition icon was added to show an incorrect OS version is found. In OS X Lion 10.7, the Apple logo was slightly shrunk and added a drop-in shadow.

In OS X Yosemite 10.10, the white screen with a gray Apple logo was replaced with a black screen with a white Apple logo, and the throbber was replaced with a progress bar, requiring a firmware update to be applied. However, this only applies to Macs from 2013 and later, including the 2012 Retina MacBook Pros, with models released in 2012 or earlier retaining the previous white screen (with the progress bar instead of the throbber). The shadow on the Apple logo was removed in OS X El Capitan 10.11 (for 2012 and earlier Macs). In 2016 and later Macs (excluding the Early 2016 MacBook), the Apple logo appears as soon as the screen turns on rather than after the startup chime. The progress bar below the Apple logo would later be slightly moved to near the bottom of the screen starting with macOS Sonoma 14.

The design of the Happy Mac was reused as the icon for Face ID, introduced in iOS 11 for iPhone and iOS 12 for iPad.

== Bomb screen and kernel panic ==
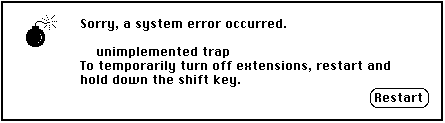
A Classic Mac OS bomb screen from System 7 onwards, indicating that an unimplemented trap occurred

A bomb screen was an error message used in the Classic Mac OS operating systems in the event of a software error. It was first used in the initial version of Classic Mac OS used in the original Macintosh in 1984, displaying a reason for the crash alongside a corresponding error code. Starting with System 7 in 1991, it was changed to be a standard error message if it believed it could manage the recovery process, resulting in the forced termination of the application. An accompanying error code is no longer present in this iteration, and in its place was the name of the error that caused the issue to occur. This iteration would be used for all versions of Classic Mac OS up to Mac OS 9.2.2, the last version of the Classic Mac OS operating system. In all instances, the "Restart" button would be present, which would allow the user to restart the computer from the operating system as the bomb screen typically locks out the user from any further use of the operating system. Oftentimes the computer would freeze after the restart button was pressed, forcing the user to hard reset the computer (many Mac users of the time would often keep a paper clip nearby alongside the computer for the same reason).

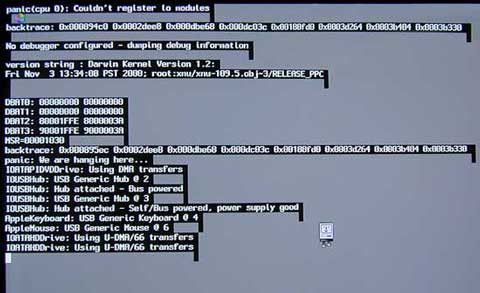
The text-based kernel panic screen as displayed in Mac OS X 10.0-10.1

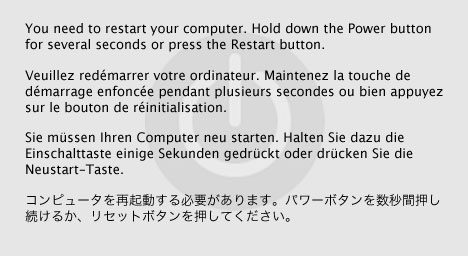
The kernel panic message screen as displayed in Mac OS X 10.2

Starting with the release of Mac OS X (now macOS) in 2001, the old "bomb screen" error messages that were found in the Classic Mac OS operating systems were replaced with a kernel panic, which is a fatal system error screen that is initiated by the operating system's kernel upon reaching a critical system error. Kernel panics in macOS initially started off as a conventional Unix-style panic notification in Mac OS X 10.0 before switching into a small error message box in Mac OS X Jaguar that provides a multilingual alert to the user, indicating that the computer needs to be restarted. The color for the kernel panic box was initially white in Mac OS X Jaguar, but was changed to black in Mac OS X Panther. In some rare instances, a Unix-style kernel panic would also be displayed with or without the kernel panic warning message. Starting with OS X Mountain Lion, the kernel panic was changed from a static box to a full-screen message, and can only be seen when the computer resets after a kernel panic has been encountered. The kernel panic message can be skipped. If there are five kernel panics occurring within three minutes after the first one, a prohibitory sign would be displayed for a few seconds before the computer shuts down afterwards. This phenomenon is known as a "recurring kernel panic".

== Sad Mac ==
A small, rectangular icon depicting a computer with an Apple logo and a floppy-disk slot, similar to that of the Happy Mac. On the small square screen is a sad-face emoticon against a white background, with "X"s for the eyes, a frown, and a differently shaped nose. The icon indicates that the machine has failed to successfully boot on startup, in contrast to the Happy Mac icon, which displays a smiling emoticon. This icon was always displayed in black and white, and was usually displayed in a black background with a one or two line hexadecimal code underneath.

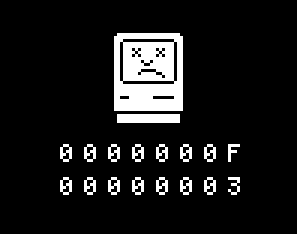
A version of the Sad Mac icon indicating that an illegal instruction trap occurred

The Sad Mac is a symbol in older-generation Apple Macintosh computers (hardware using the Old World ROM and not Open Firmware, which are those predating onboard USB), starting with the original 128K Macintosh and ending with the last NuBus-based Power Macintosh models (including the first-generation 6100, 7100, 8100, as well as the PowerBook 5300 and 1400), to indicate a severe hardware or software problem that prevented startup from occurring successfully. The Sad Mac icon is displayed, along with a set of hexadecimal codes that indicate the type of problem at startup. Different codes exist for different errors. This is in place of the normal Happy Mac icon, which indicates that the startup-time hardware tests were successful. The icon itself remained unchanged throughout most of the Classic Mac OS lifespan and was always displayed in black and white; it was never updated to 8-bit color unlike the Happy Mac and its related icons.

Most models made prior to the Macintosh II crash silently and display the Sad Mac without playing any tone. In 68k models made after the Macintosh II, a series of sounds known as the Chimes of Death (see below) are played. Most PowerPC Macs play a sound effect of a car crash, while computers equipped with a PowerPC upgrade card use a three note brass fanfare death chime (A, E♮, and E♭) with the sound of drums and cymbals at the end, taken from the Power Macintosh/Performa 6200 and 6300.

A Sad Mac can be deliberately generated at startup by pressing the interrupt switch (Also known as the Programmer's Key) on Macintosh computers that had one installed or by pressing Command and Power keys shortly after the startup chime. These functions normally opened up a debugger window within the operating system but triggers a Sad Mac error on startup when it is accessed before booting into an operating system. On some Macintoshes such as PowerBook 540c, if the user presses the command and power keys before the boot screen is displayed, only the Chimes of Death are played. Depending on the model, the chimes would play much faster or slower than normal and there is no Sad Mac displayed.

Old World ROM Power Macintosh and PowerBook models based on the PCI architecture do not use a Sad Mac icon and will instead only play the error/car-crash sound on a hardware failure (such as missing or bad memory, unusable CPU, or similar errors).

An equivalent to the Sad Mac on macOS is a Universal "no" symbol introduced in Mac OS X 10.2 Jaguar and later, which denotes a hardware or software error that renders the computer non-bootable as well as indicating that an incorrect OS has been found (as mentioned above).

== Chimes of Death ==
The first version of the Chimes of Death, as used on the Macintosh II.

The Chimes of Death are the Macintosh equivalent of a beep code on IBM PC compatibles. On all Macintosh models predating the adoption of PCI and Open Firmware, the Chimes of Death are often accompanied by a Sad Mac icon in the middle of the screen (see "Sad Mac" above).

Different Macintosh series have different death chimes. The Macintosh II is the first to use the death chimes, using the Apple Sound Chip to play a loud and eerie upward major arpeggio, with different chimes on many models. The Macintosh Quadra, Centris, Performa, LC, and the Macintosh Classic II play a generally softer and lower pitched version of the upward major arpeggio, followed by three or four notes, with slight variations depending on the model of the Macintosh. The PowerBook 5300, 190, and 1400 use the second half of the 8-note arpeggio as found on the Quadra and Centris models, or the entire death chime if the error occurs before the screen lights up. The Macintosh Quadra/Centris 660AV use a sound of a single pass of the Roland D-50's "Digital Native Dance" sample loop combined with a few sound effects from the Roland U-20, while the NuBus-based Power Macintosh models (including the 6100, 7100, and 8100 series) use a car crash sound made using a assorted collection of sound effects from Elektra Records and Hanna-Barbera. The Power Macintosh and Performa 6200 and 6300 series along with the Power Macintosh (PowerPC) upgrade card use an eerily dramatic 3-note brass fanfare with a rhythm of drums and cymbals composed on the Roland U-20. In the case of the Power Macintosh/Performa 6200 and 6300, the aforementioned death chime plays before the screen lights up for these models while the 8-note arpeggio similar to that found in the Quadra and Centris series plays after the screen lights up. The pre-G3 PCI Power Macs, the beige G3 Power Macs, the G3 All-In-One, and the PowerBook 2400, 3400, and G3 all use the sound of popping and glass shattering; these models do not display a Sad Mac icon.

With the introduction of the iMac in 1998, the Chimes of Death are no longer used in favor of a series of tones to indicate hardware errors.

== See also ==
- Booting
- Power-on self-test
- Screen of death
- Floppy disk
