= System crash screen =

Fatal error displays in operating systems

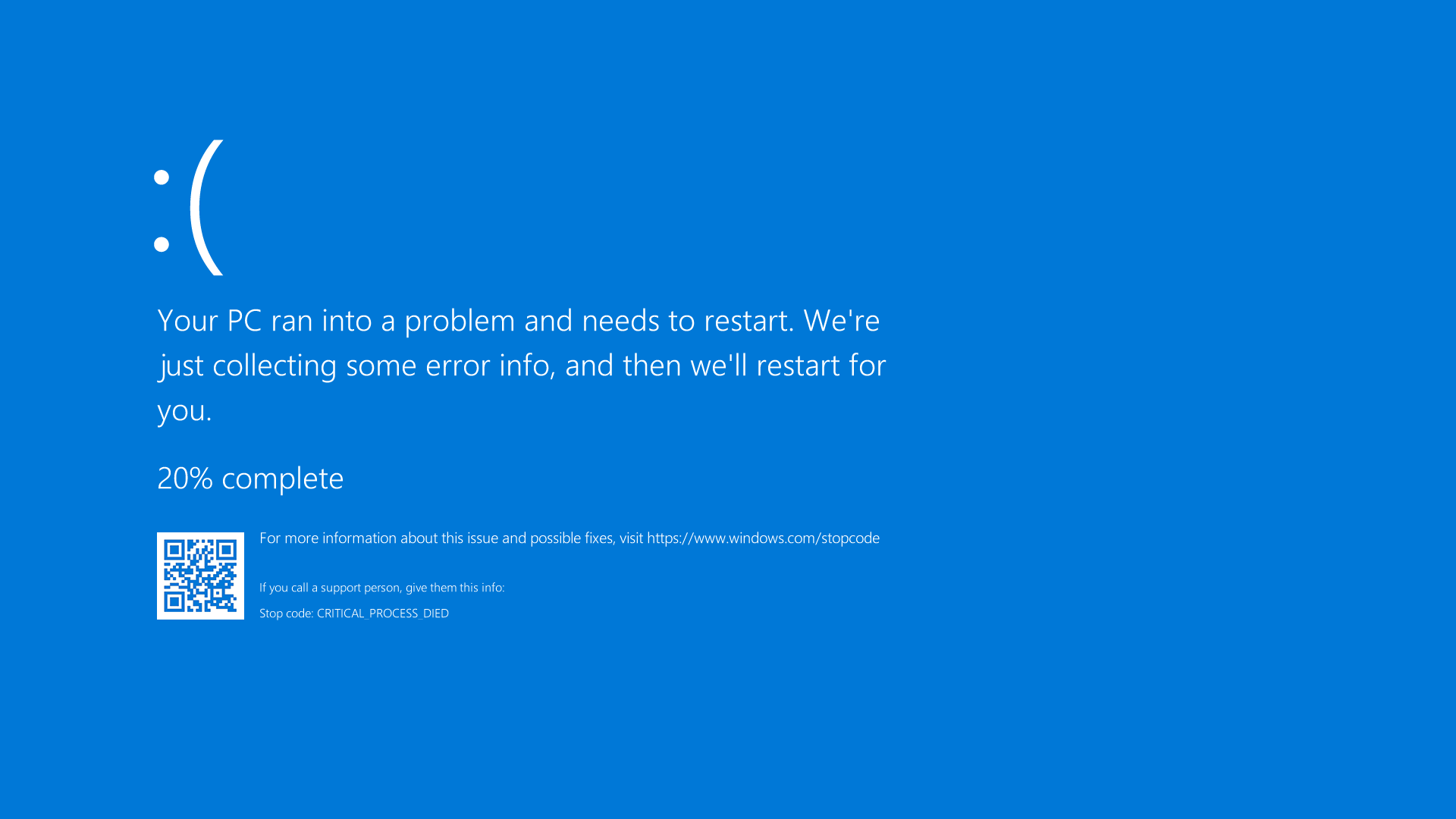
The Blue Screen of Death for Windows 10, which includes a sad emoticon and a QR code for quick troubleshooting

In computing, a system crash screen, error screen or screen of death is a visual indicator that appears when an operating system, software application, or hardware encounters a severe issue that prevents normal operation. These screens typically serve as a last-resort mechanism to inform users and system administrators of a critical failure. An error screen may display technical information such as error messages, diagnostic codes, memory dumps, or troubleshooting instructions. They can occur due to hardware malfunctions, corrupted system files, software crashes, overheating, or other critical failures. Error screens vary by operating system and device, with some of the most well-known examples being the Blue Screen of Death (BSOD) in Windows, the Sad Mac in classic Macintosh computers, and the Kernel Panic in Unix-based systems like Linux and macOS. Game consoles may also have notable crash screens, such as the PlayStation 2 and the Nintendo Wii.

== Notable examples ==
A Linux kernel panic, forced by an attempt to kill init

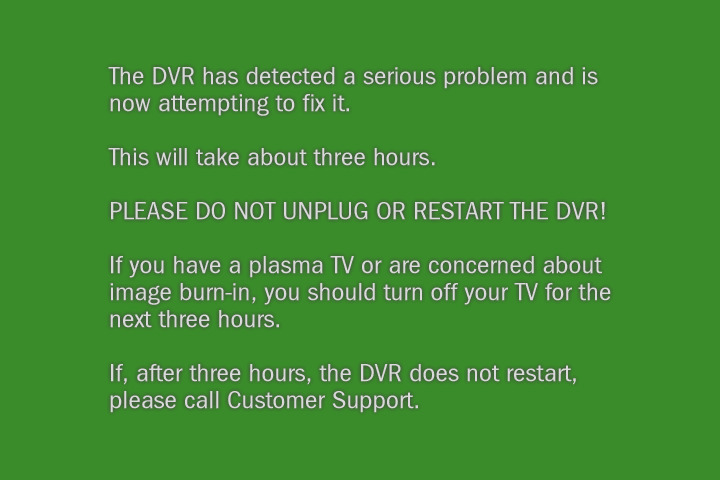
The green screen of death on a TiVo digital video recorder

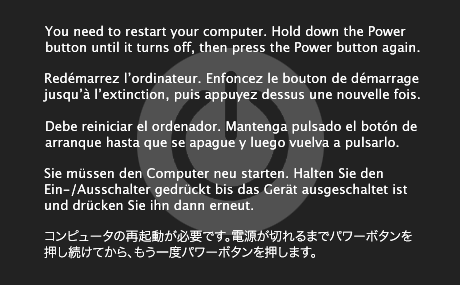
The Mac OS X kernel panic alert. This screen was introduced in Mac OS X 10.2, while the kernel panic itself was around since the Mac OS X Public Beta.

- The Blue Screen of Death (also called BSoD, or stop error) is a common name for a screen displayed by the Microsoft Windows operating system when a critical system error occurs. By far, this is the most famous screen of death.
- Black Screens of Death are used by several systems. One is a failure mode of Windows 3.x. One appears when the bootloader for Windows Vista and later fails. In early Windows 11 previews, the Blue Screen of Death was changed to black. In June 2025, Microsoft announced that the Blue Screen of Death would change to Black Screen of Death on Windows 11 in an update during summer 2025.
- A Green Screen of Death is a green screen that appears on a TiVo with a message that includes the words "the DVR has detected a serious problem and is now attempting to fix it" or "A severe error has occurred". Its appearance often means that the hard drive is corrupted and it will attempt to clean up, check, and/or repair the TiVo Media File System. A Blue Screen of Death on a Windows Insider build appears as green instead of blue, starting with build 14997.
- The Purple Screen of Death is used by VMware ESXi, a server virtualization product by VMware. It is displayed in the event of a fatal kernel error. The screen provides error codes that can be used for debugging purposes.

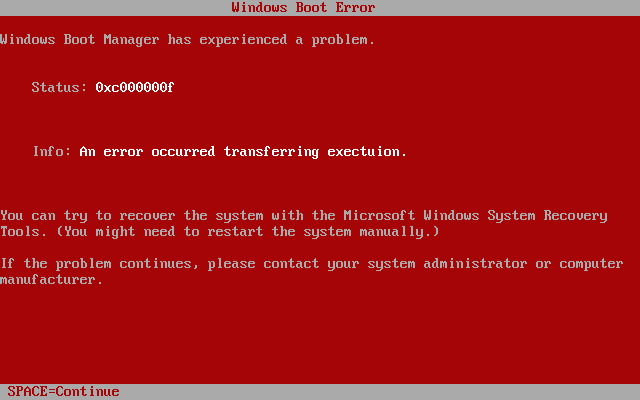
The red screen of death in Windows Longhorn Build 5048

- The Red Screen of Death is used primarily by four different systems: One appears in early beta versions of Windows Vista, but it later became a black screen. Another was in Windows 98 beta builds and was caused by an error with the ACPI. It also appears on the Atari Jaguar if there is a loading cartridge error or a pirated cartridge is detected, marked by the roar of a jaguar and a red Atari Jaguar logo on a screen that changes color from black to red. A similar error happens on the Sega Genesis (also known as Sega Mega Drive) if an incorrect checksum is detected. It is also shown on the PlayStation One (facelift), 2, 3, 4, and Portable. On the PlayStation One and PlayStation 2, the red screen of death bears similarities to the regular startups, such as the pitched-down menu screen audio and its subsequent ambient noises, alongside a faint whistle on the PlayStation 2. After the normal startup, a red screen will appear with a message saying "Please insert a PlayStation (or PlayStation 2) format disc". This error can be obtained by inserting a non-compatible disc, e.g. a PC game disc or later Xbox 360 discs. On the PlayStation 3 and PlayStation Portable, a red screen of death appears during a severe error in the console's internals, with the message saying "A serious error has occurred. Contact technical support for assistance" in multiple languages. On the PlayStation 4, the error is also caused by an internal error, but has no message and is just a red screen.

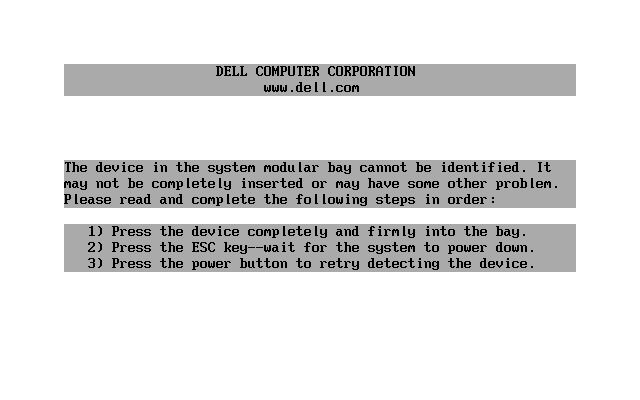
The white screen of death that appears on Dell computers

- A White Screen of Death appears on several other operating systems, content management systems, and on some BIOS, such as from Dell.
- A Yellow Screen of Death occurs when an ASP.NET web app finds a problem and crashes.
- A kernel panic is the Unix equivalent of Microsoft's Blue Screen of Death. It is a routine called when the kernel detects irrecoverable errors in runtime correctness; in other words, when continuing the operation may risk escalating system instability, and a system reboot is easier than attempted recovery.
- A Sad Mac is a symbol used by older-generation Apple Macintosh computers, starting with the original Macintosh 128K, to indicate a severe hardware or software problem that prevented startup from occurring successfully. A similar symbol exists for the iPod.
- The Bomb icon is a symbol that was displayed when a classic Mac OS program crashed. The bomb symbols were also used by the Atari ST line of computers when the system encountered a fatal system error. The number of bombs indicated the exact cause of the error.
- Guru Meditation is the name of the error that occurred on early versions of the Amiga computers when they crashed. It was also used on the Nintendo DS, most commonly seen when using homebrew.
- Kernel Debugging Land is the name of the Kernel Debugger users of Haiku and BeOS see when a kernel crash happens.

== See also ==
- Kill screen
- Xbox 360 technical problems (Common name for a hardware error is the 'Red Ring of Death'.)
