= Neowin =

Microsoft news website

neowin.net

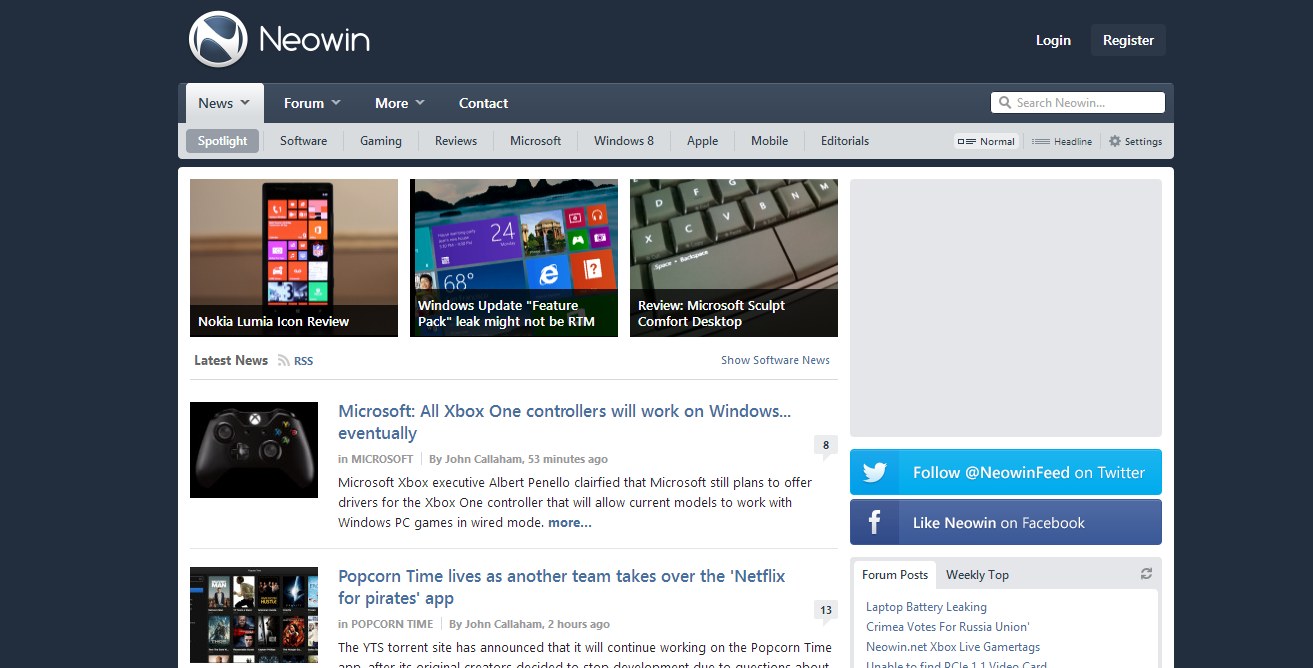
- Homepage
- Website type: Technology news and discussion
- Available in: English
- Owner: Neowin LLC (40% owned by Stardock)
- Website: www.neowin.net
- Registration: Optional
- Launched: October 2000
- Current status: Online

Neowin is a technology news website described as a 'Microsoft enthusiast site.' The site also offers analysis and reporting on mobile news, tech trends, gadgets and new technological developments, as well as in-depth product reviews.

== History ==
Neowin was begun as a hobby in October 2000 by Marcel Klum, Lee Logan and Steven Parker, known within the forums as "Redmak", "Cr1t1cal" and "Neobond", respectively, reporting news about the Windows XP alpha and beta releases (then known as "Windows Codename Whistler").

Neowin has broken several stories, including the leak of Windows 2000 source code onto the internet.

== Site structure ==
The website offers news, technology reviews, and opinion articles, as well as an IRC server and forums. Over 345,000 users have registered for the forums as of 2011, making over 11,000,000 posts as of June 2016. Two projects initiated by members of the Neowin community include a community game server for Team Fortress 2 and a Folding@home team.
