= Stack overflow (disambiguation) =

A stack overflow is a programming error when too much memory is used on the call stack.

Stack overflow may also refer to:

- Stack buffer overflow, when a program writes to a memory address on the program's call stack outside of the intended data structure; usually a fixed length buffer
- Stack Overflow, a question-and-answer website on the topic of computer programming
