= Page protection =

Page protection may refer to:

- In computer architecture, memory protection with page granularity
  - NX bit, no-execute page protection
- On Wikipedia, Wikipedia#Restrictions, restrictions on user editing
  - On Wikipedia, Wikipedia:Requests for page protection
