= Linux Test Project =

Linux Test Project (LTP)
- Initial release: 9 April 2001; 23 years ago
- Repository: github.com/linux-test-project/ltp
- Written in: C, Shell
- Operating system: Linux, partly all Unix-like
- License: GPL
- Website: linux-test-project.github.io

The Linux Test Project (usually referred to as LTP) is a body of regression and conformance tests designed to confirm the behaviour of the Linux kernel as well as glibc.

The LTP is a joint project started by SGI, developed and maintained by IBM, Cisco, Fujitsu, SUSE, Red Hat and others. The project source code was migrated to git and is available on GitHub.

The LTP aims to test and improve Linux. The LTP provides a suite of automated testing tools for Linux as well as tools for publishing the results of ran tests.
