= Enhanced Mitigation Experience Toolkit =

Exploit mitigation software

- Developer: Microsoft
- Release: 2009
- Final release: 5.52 / November 14, 2016; 9 years ago
- Operating system: Windows Vista and later, or Windows Server 2008 and later
- Platform: .NET Framework 4.5
- Type: Security software
- License: Freeware
- Website: microsoft.com/emet

Enhanced Mitigation Experience Toolkit (EMET) is a freeware security toolkit for Microsoft Windows, developed by Microsoft. It provides a unified interface to enable and fine-tune Windows security features. It can be used as an extra layer of defense against malware attacks, after the firewall and before antivirus software.

EMET is targeted mostly at system administrators but the newest version is supported for any Windows user running Windows 7 and later, or Windows Server 2008 R2 and later, with .NET Framework 4.5 installed. The final edition of Windows that supported EMET was version 1703 (Creator's Update). Microsoft then changed the coding in the Fall Creator's Update of Windows 10, so it no longer supported EMET. Older versions can be used on Windows XP, but not all features are available. Version 4.1 was the last version to support Windows XP.

Microsoft has announced that EMET will reach end of life on July 31, 2018. The website for microsoft.com/emet now leads to the Bing Search Site. The successors to EMET are the ProcessMitigations Module—aka Process Mitigation Management Tool—and the Windows Defender Exploit Guard only available on Windows 10 and Windows Server 2016.
