= NX bit =

Technology used in CPUs

The NX bit (no-execute bit) is a processor feature that separates areas of a virtual address space (the memory layout a program uses) into sections for storing data or program instructions. An operating system supporting the NX bit can mark certain areas of the virtual address space as non-executable, preventing the processor from running any code stored there. This technique, known as executable-space protection or Write XOR Execute, protects computers from malicious software that attempts to insert harmful code into another program’s data storage area and execute it, such as in a buffer overflow attack.

The term "NX bit" was introduced by Advanced Micro Devices (AMD) as a marketing term. Intel markets this feature as the XD bit (execute disable), while the MIPS architecture refers to it as the XI bit (execute inhibit). In the ARM architecture, introduced in ARMv6, it is known as XN (execute never). The term NX bit is often used broadly to describe similar executable-space protection technologies in other processors.

== Architecture support ==
=== x86 ===
x86 processors, since the 80286, included a similar capability implemented at the segment level. However, almost all operating systems for the 80386 and later x86 processors implement the flat memory model, so they cannot use this capability. There was no "Executable" flag in the page table entry (page descriptor) in those processors to make this capability available to operating systems using the flat memory model, until AMD added a "no-execute" or NX bit to the page table entry in its AMD64 architecture, providing a mechanism that can control execution per page rather than per whole segment.

Intel implemented a similar feature in its Itanium (Merced) processor—having IA-64 architecture—in 2001, but did not bring it to the more popular x86 processor families (Pentium, Celeron, Xeon, etc.). In the x86 architecture it was first implemented by AMD, as the NX bit, for use by its AMD64 line of processors, such as the Athlon 64 and Opteron.

After AMD's decision to include this functionality in its AMD64 instruction set, Intel implemented the similar XD bit feature in x86 processors beginning with the Pentium 4 processors based on later iterations of the Prescott core. The NX bit specifically refers to bit number 63 (i.e. the most significant bit) of a 64-bit entry in the page table. If this bit is set to 0, then code can be executed from that page; if set to 1, code cannot be executed from that page, and anything residing there is assumed to be data. It is only available with the long mode (64-bit mode) or legacy Physical Address Extension (PAE) page-table formats, but not x86's original 32-bit page table format because page table entries in that format lack the 64th bit used to disable and enable execution.

Windows XP SP2 and later support Data Execution Prevention (DEP).

=== ARM ===
In ARMv6, a new page table entry format was introduced; it includes an "execute never" bit. For ARMv8-A, VMSAv8-64 block and page descriptors, and VMSAv8-32 long-descriptor block and page descriptors, for stage 1 translations have "execute never" bits for both privileged and unprivileged modes, and block and page descriptors for stage 2 translations have a single "execute never" bit (two bits due to ARMv8.2-TTS2UXN feature); VMSAv8-32 short-descriptor translation table descriptors at level 1 have "execute never" bits for both privileged and unprivileged mode and at level 2 have a single "execute never" bit.

=== Alpha ===
As of the Fourth Edition of the Alpha Architecture manual, DEC (now HP) Alpha has a Fault on Execute bit in page table entries with the OpenVMS, Tru64 UNIX, and Alpha Linux PALcode.

=== SPARC ===
The SPARC Reference MMU for Sun SPARC version 8 has permission values of Read Only, Read/Write, Read/Execute, and Read/Write/Execute in page table entries, although not all SPARC processors have a SPARC Reference MMU.

A SPARC version 9 MMU may provide, but is not required to provide, any combination of read/write/execute permissions. A Translation Table Entry in a Translation Storage Buffer in Oracle SPARC Architecture 2011, Draft D1.0.0 has separate Executable and Writable bits.

=== PowerPC/Power ISA ===
Page table entries for IBM PowerPC's hashed page tables have a no-execute page bit. Page table entries for radix-tree page tables in the Power ISA have separate permission bits granting read/write and execute access.

=== PA-RISC ===
Translation lookaside buffer (TLB) entries and page table entries in PA-RISC 1.1 and PA-RISC 2.0 support read-only, read/write, read/execute, and read/write/execute pages.

=== Itanium ===
TLB entries in Itanium support read-only, read/write, read/execute, and read/write/execute pages.

=== z/Architecture ===
As of the twelfth edition of the z/Architecture Principles of Operation, z/Architecture processors may support the Instruction-Execution Protection facility, which adds a bit in page table entries that controls whether instructions from a given region, segment, or page can be executed.

== See also ==
- Executable-space protection
- W^X
