= BRK (disambiguation) =

BRK is an interrupt in 65xx computer processors.

BRK may also refer to:

- "brk" and sbrk, Unix system calls
- B-R-K, a Semitic root of given name Barak
- BRK.A and BRK.B, NYSE symbols of Berkshire Hathaway
- BRK Brands, US, retail brand First Alert
- Berkshire, county in England, Chapman code
- Brioche-knit stitch in brioche knitting
- Birgid language, ISO 639-3 language code
- Briansk State Air Enterprise, see List of airline codes (B)
- Bourke Airport, NSW, Australia, IATA airport code
- Berwick railway station (East Sussex), England
- Marijan Brkić Brk, a Croatian guitarist
- PTK6, or BRK, breast tumor kinase
- Belgrade Rugby Club
- BRK, seismological station code for the Berkeley Seismological Laboratory
