= Get Started (disambiguation) =

Get Started is a David Lindgren album and song

Get Started may also refer to:

- Get Started, Monkey Majik EP
- Get Started, Queensrÿche EP
- "Get Started", a Paul McCartney song from Egypt Station
- Get Started (Windows), a tutorial for using Microsoft Windows
