= LDD =

LDD may refer to:

== Government and politics ==
- Libertarian, Direct, Democratic, a Belgian party
- Lidhja Demokratike e Dardanisë (English: Democratic League of Dardania), a Kosovan party
- Local development document, in UK planning law

== Science and technology ==
- ldd (Unix), a command-line utility
- Lego Digital Designer, CAD software
- Lhermitte–Duclos disease, a rare brain tumour
- Local Dialing Disparity
- Lymantria dispar dispar, a moth species
- Lightly Doped Drain, in a Metal–Oxide–Semiconductor Field-Effect Transistor

== Other uses ==
- Learning difficulties and disabilities (UK)
- Living Dead Dolls
- Long Distance Dedication, a feature on the weekly syndicated radio program American Top 40
- Lycée Denis Diderot (Kenya), a French international school
