= C dynamic memory allocation =

Dynamic memory management in the C programming language

C dynamic memory allocation refers to performing manual memory management for dynamic memory allocation in the C programming language via a group of functions in the C standard library, mainly malloc, realloc, calloc, aligned_alloc and free.

The C++ programming language includes these functions; however, the operators new and delete provide similar functionality and are recommended by that language's authors. Still, there are several situations in which using new/delete is not applicable, such as garbage collection code or performance-sensitive code, and a combination of malloc and new may be required instead of the higher-level new operator.

Many different implementations of the actual memory allocation mechanism, used by malloc, are available. Their performance varies in both execution time and required memory.

== Rationale ==
The C programming language manages memory statically, automatically, or dynamically. Static-duration variables are allocated in main memory, usually along with the executable code of the program, and persist for the lifetime of the program; automatic-duration variables are allocated on the stack and come and go as functions are called and return. For static-duration and automatic-duration variables, the size of the allocation must be compile-time constant (except for the case of variable-length automatic arrays). If the required size is not known until run-time (for example, if data of arbitrary size is being read from the user or from a disk file), then using fixed-size data objects is inadequate.

The lifetime of allocated memory can also cause concern. Neither static- nor automatic-duration memory is adequate for all situations. Automatic-allocated data cannot persist across multiple function calls, while static data persists for the life of the program whether it is needed or not. In many situations the programmer requires greater flexibility in managing the lifetime of allocated memory.

These limitations are avoided by using dynamic memory allocation, in which memory is more explicitly (but more flexibly) managed, typically by allocating it from the heap (free storage), an area of memory structured for this purpose. In C, the library function malloc is used to allocate a block of memory on the heap. The program accesses this block of memory via a pointer that malloc returns. When the memory is no longer needed, the pointer is passed to free which deallocates the memory so that it can be used for other purposes.

The original description of C indicated that calloc and cfree were in the standard library, but not malloc. Code for a simple model implementation of a storage manager for Unix was given with alloc and free as the user interface functions, and using the sbrk system call to request memory from the operating system. The 6th Edition Unix documentation gives alloc and free as the low-level memory allocation functions. The malloc and free routines in their modern form are completely described in the 7th Edition Unix manual.

Some platforms provide library or intrinsic function calls which allow run-time dynamic allocation from the C stack rather than the heap (e.g. alloca()). This memory is automatically freed when the calling function ends.

== Overview of functions ==
The C dynamic memory allocation functions are defined in <stdlib.h> header (<cstdlib> header in C++).

Function	Description
malloc	allocates the specified number of bytes
aligned_alloc	allocates the specified number of bytes at the specified alignment
realloc	increases or decreases the size of the specified block of memory, moving it if necessary
calloc	allocates the specified number of bytes and initializes them to zero
free	releases the specified block of memory back to the system

=== Differences between malloc() and calloc() ===
- malloc() takes a single argument (the amount of memory to allocate in bytes), while calloc() takes two arguments — the number of elements and the size of each element.
- malloc() only allocates memory, while calloc() allocates and sets the bytes in the allocated region to zero.

== Usage example ==
Creating an array of ten integers with automatic scope is straightforward in C:

int a[10];

However, the size of the array is fixed at compile time. If one wishes to allocate a similar array dynamically without using a variable-length array, which is not guaranteed to be supported in all C11 implementations, an array can be allocated using malloc, which returns a void pointer (indicating that it is a pointer to a region of unknown data type), which can be cast for safety.

int* a = (int*)malloc(10 * sizeof(int));

This computes the number of bytes that ten integers occupy in memory, then requests that many bytes from malloc and assigns the result to a pointer named a (due to C syntax, pointers and arrays can be used interchangeably in some situations).

Because malloc might not be able to service the request, it might return a null pointer and it is good programming practice to check for this:

int* a = (int*)malloc(10 * sizeof(int));
if (!a) {
    fprintf(stderr, "malloc failed\n");
    return -1;
}

When the program no longer needs the dynamic array, it must eventually call free to return the memory it occupies to the free store:

free(a);

The memory set aside by malloc is not initialized and may contain cruft: the remnants of previously used and discarded data. After allocation with malloc, elements of the array are uninitialized variables. The command calloc will return an allocation that has already been cleared:

int* a = (int*)calloc(10, sizeof(int));

With realloc we can resize the amount of memory a pointer points to. For example, if we have a pointer acting as an array of size $n$ and we want to change it to an array of size $m$, we can use realloc.

int* a = (int*)malloc(2 * sizeof(int));
a[0] = 1;
a[1] = 2;
a = (int*)realloc(a, 3 * sizeof(int));
a[2] = 3;

Note that realloc must be assumed to have changed the base address of the block (i.e. if it has failed to extend the size of the original block, and has therefore allocated a new larger block elsewhere and copied the old contents into it). Therefore, any pointers to addresses within the original block are also no longer valid.

== Type safety ==
As stated earlier, malloc returns a void pointer (void*), which indicates that it is a pointer to a region of unknown data type. The use of casting is required in C++ due to the strong type system, whereas this is not the case in C. One may "cast" (see type conversion) this pointer to a specific type:

// without a cast
int* ptr1 = malloc(10 * sizeof(*ptr));

// with a cast
int* ptr2 = (int*)malloc(10 * sizeof(*ptr));

There are advantages and disadvantages to performing such a cast. Including the cast improves interoperability between C and C++, allowing C code to be compiled or used as C++. Furthermore, the cast allows for pre-1989 versions of malloc that originally returned a char*. Additionally, casting can help the developer identify inconsistencies in type sizing should the destination pointer type change, particularly if the pointer is declared far from the malloc() call (although modern compilers and static analysers can warn on such behaviour without requiring the cast).

However, under the C standard, the cast is not necessary, and adding the cast may mask failure to include the header <stdlib.h>, in which the function prototype for malloc is found. In the absence of a prototype for malloc, the C90 standard requires that the C compiler assume malloc returns an int. If there is no cast, C90 requires a diagnostic when this integer is assigned to the pointer; however, with the cast, this diagnostic would not be produced, hiding a bug. On certain architectures and data models (such as LP64 on 64-bit systems, where long and pointers are 64-bit and int is 32-bit), this error can actually result in undefined behaviour, as the implicitly declared malloc returns a 32-bit value whereas the actually defined function returns a 64-bit value. Depending on calling conventions and memory layout, this may result in stack smashing. This issue is less likely to go unnoticed in modern compilers, as C99 does not permit implicit declarations, so the compiler must produce a diagnostic even if it does assume int return. Additionally, if the type of the pointer is changed at its declaration, the lines where malloc is called and the cast will have to be updated as well.

In C++, if std::malloc must be used, it is preferable to static_cast it, rather than use a raw cast:

int* p = static_cast<int*>(malloc(10 * sizeof(*ptr)));

== Common errors ==
The improper use of dynamic memory allocation can frequently be a source of bugs. These can include security bugs or program crashes, most often due to segmentation faults.

Most common errors are as follows:

Not checking for allocation failures
Memory allocation is not guaranteed to succeed, and may instead return a null pointer. Using the returned value, without checking if the allocation is successful, invokes undefined behavior. This usually leads to crash (due to the resulting segmentation fault on the null pointer dereference), but there is no guarantee that a crash will happen so relying on that can also lead to problems.
Memory leaks
Failure to deallocate memory using free leads to the buildup of non-reusable memory, which is no longer used by the program. This wastes memory resources and can lead to allocation failures when these resources are exhausted.
Logical errors
All allocations must follow the same pattern: allocation using malloc, usage to store data, deallocation using free. Failures to adhere to this pattern, such as memory usage after a call to free (dangling pointer) or before a call to malloc (wild pointer), calling free twice ("double free"), etc., usually causes a segmentation fault and results in a crash of the program. These errors can be transient and hard to debug – for example, freed memory is usually not immediately reclaimed by the OS, and thus dangling pointers may persist for a while and appear to work.

In addition, as an interface that precedes ANSI C standardization, malloc and its associated functions have behaviors that were intentionally left to the implementation to define for themselves. One of them is the zero-length allocation, which is more of a problem with realloc since it is more common to resize to zero. Although both POSIX and the Single Unix Specification require proper handling of 0-size allocations by either returning NULL or something else that can be safely freed, not all platforms are required to abide by these rules. Among the many double-free errors that it has led to, the 2019 WhatsApp RCE was especially prominent. A way to wrap these functions to make them safer is by simply checking for 0-size allocations and turning them into those of size 1. (Returning NULL has its own problems: it otherwise indicates an out-of-memory failure. In the case of realloc it would have signaled that the original memory was not moved and freed, which again is not the case for size 0, leading to the double-free.)

== Implementations ==
The implementation of memory management depends greatly upon operating system and architecture. Some operating systems supply an allocator for malloc, while others supply functions to control certain regions of data. The same dynamic memory allocator is often used to implement both malloc and the operator new in C++.

=== Heap-based ===
Implementation of legacy allocators was commonly done using the heap segment. The allocator would usually expand and contract the heap to fulfill allocation requests.

The heap method suffers from a few inherent flaws:

- A linear allocator can only shrink if the last allocation is released. Even if largely unused, the heap can get "stuck" at a very large size because of a small but long-lived allocation at its tip which could waste any amount of address space, although some allocators on some systems may be able to release entirely empty intermediate pages to the OS.
- A linear allocator is sensitive to fragmentation. A good allocator will attempt to track and reuse free slots through the entire heap, but as allocation sizes and lifetimes get mixed it can be difficult and expensive to find or coalesce free segments large enough to hold new allocation requests.
- A linear allocator has extremely poor concurrency characteristics, as the heap segment is per-process every thread has to synchronise on allocation, and concurrent allocations from threads which may have very different work loads amplifies the previous two issues.

=== dlmalloc and ptmalloc ===
Doug Lea has developed the public domain dlmalloc ("Doug Lea's Malloc") as a general-purpose allocator, starting in 1987. The GNU C library (glibc) is derived from Wolfram Gloger's ptmalloc ("pthreads malloc"), a fork of dlmalloc with threading-related improvements. As of November 2023, the latest version of dlmalloc is version 2.8.6 from August 2012. In 2023 it was relicensed from CC0 to MIT-0.

dlmalloc is a boundary tag allocator. Memory on the heap is allocated as "chunks", an 8-byte aligned data structure which contains a header, and usable memory. Allocated memory contains an 8- or 16-byte overhead for the size of the chunk and usage flags (similar to a dope vector). Unallocated chunks also store pointers to other free chunks in the usable space area, making the minimum chunk size 16 bytes on 32-bit systems and 24/32 (depends on alignment) bytes on 64-bit systems.

Unallocated memory is grouped into "bins" of similar sizes, implemented by using a double-linked list of chunks (with pointers stored in the unallocated space inside the chunk). Bins are sorted by size into three classes:

- For requests below 256 bytes (a "smallbin" request), a simple two power best fit allocator is used. If there are no free blocks in that bin, a block from the next highest bin is split in two.
- For requests of 256 bytes or above but below the mmap threshold, dlmalloc since v2.8.0 use an in-place bitwise trie algorithm ("treebin"). If there is no free space left to satisfy the request, dlmalloc tries to increase the size of the heap, usually via the brk system call. This feature was introduced way after ptmalloc was created (from v2.7.x), and as a result is not a part of glibc, which inherits the old best-fit allocator.
- For requests above the mmap threshold (a "largebin" request), the memory is always allocated using the mmap system call. The threshold is usually 128 KB. The mmap method averts problems with huge buffers trapping a small allocation at the end after their expiration, but always allocates an entire page of memory, which on many architectures is 4096 bytes in size.

Game developer Adrian Stone argues that dlmalloc, as a boundary-tag allocator, is unfriendly for console systems that have virtual memory but do not have demand paging. This is because its pool-shrinking and growing callbacks (sysmalloc/systrim) cannot be used to allocate and commit individual pages of virtual memory. In the absence of demand paging, fragmentation becomes a greater concern.

=== FreeBSD's and NetBSD's jemalloc ===
Since FreeBSD 7.0 and NetBSD 5.0, the old malloc implementation (phkmalloc by Poul-Henning Kamp) was replaced by jemalloc, written by Jason Evans. The main reason for this was a lack of scalability of phkmalloc in terms of multithreading. In order to avoid lock contention, jemalloc uses separate "arenas" for each CPU. Experiments measuring number of allocations per second in multithreading application have shown that this makes it scale linearly with the number of threads, while for both phkmalloc and dlmalloc performance was inversely proportional to the number of threads.

=== OpenBSD's malloc ===
OpenBSD's implementation of the malloc function makes use of mmap. For requests greater in size than one page, the entire allocation is retrieved using mmap; smaller sizes are assigned from memory pools maintained by malloc within a number of "bucket pages", also allocated with mmap. On a call to free, memory is released and unmapped from the process address space using munmap. This system is designed to improve security by taking advantage of the address space layout randomization and gap page features implemented as part of OpenBSD's mmap system call, and to detect use-after-free bugs—as a large memory allocation is completely unmapped after it is freed, further use causes a segmentation fault and termination of the program.

The GrapheneOS project initially started out by porting OpenBSD's memory allocator to Android's Bionic C Library.

=== Hoard malloc ===
Hoard is an allocator whose goal is scalable memory allocation performance. Like OpenBSD's allocator, Hoard uses mmap exclusively, but manages memory in chunks of 64 kilobytes called superblocks. Hoard's heap is logically divided into a single global heap and a number of per-processor heaps. In addition, there is a thread-local cache that can hold a limited number of superblocks. By allocating only from superblocks on the local per-thread or per-processor heap, and moving mostly-empty superblocks to the global heap so they can be reused by other processors, Hoard keeps fragmentation low while achieving near linear scalability with the number of threads.

=== mimalloc ===
An open-source compact general-purpose memory allocator from Microsoft Research with focus on performance. The library is about 11,000 lines of code.

=== Thread-caching malloc (tcmalloc) ===
Every thread has a thread-local storage for small allocations. For large allocations mmap or sbrk can be used. TCMalloc, a malloc developed by Google, has garbage-collection for local storage of dead threads. The TCMalloc is considered to be more than twice as fast as glibc's ptmalloc for multithreaded programs.

=== In-kernel ===
Operating system kernels need to allocate memory just as application programs do. The implementation of malloc within a kernel often differs significantly from the implementations used by C libraries, however. For example, memory buffers might need to conform to special restrictions imposed by DMA, or the memory allocation function might be called from interrupt context. This necessitates a malloc implementation tightly integrated with the virtual memory subsystem of the operating system kernel.

== Overriding malloc ==
Because malloc and its relatives can have a strong impact on the performance of a program, it is common to override the functions for a specific application by custom implementations that are optimized for application's allocation patterns. The C standard does not specify a way of doing this, but operating systems have found various ways to do this by exploiting dynamic linking. One way is to simply link in a different library to override the symbols. Another, employed by Unix System V.3, is to make malloc and free function pointers that an application can reset to custom functions.

In the source code the function can easily be replaced by using preprocessor macros, such as

#define malloc custom_malloc
#define realloc custom_realloc
#define free custom_free

which get defined in a header that all files that use memory allocation functions must include. These macros should also replace the function strdup, since its result is passed to free too. Data allocated inside of library functions (like FILE structures in the stdio.h) still get directly handled without using the wrappers.

The most common form on POSIX-like systems is to set the environment variable LD_PRELOAD with the path of the allocator, so that the dynamic linker uses that version of malloc/calloc/free instead of the libc implementation.

== Allocation size limits ==
The largest possible memory block malloc can allocate depends on the host system, particularly the size of physical memory and the operating system implementation.

Theoretically, the largest number should be the maximum value that can be held in a size_t type, which is an implementation-dependent unsigned integer representing the size of an area of memory. In the C99 standard and later, it is available as the SIZE_MAX constant from <stdint.h>. Although not guaranteed by ISO C, it is usually 2^(CHAR_BIT * sizeof(size_t)) - 1.

On glibc systems, the largest possible memory block malloc can allocate is only half this size, namely 2^(CHAR_BIT * sizeof(ptrdiff_t) - 1) - 1.

On systems that use segmentation, like some memory models under MS-DOS, the largest possible memory block is typically one segment or less and thus significantly smaller than the total address space, and size_t might be a smaller type than ptrdiff_t.

== Extensions and alternatives ==
The C library implementations shipping with various operating systems and compilers may come with alternatives and extensions to the standard malloc interface. Notable among these is:

- alloca, which allocates a requested number of bytes on the call stack. No corresponding deallocation function exists, as typically the memory is deallocated as soon as the calling function returns. alloca was present on Unix systems as early as 32/V (1978), but its use can be problematic in some (e.g., embedded) contexts. While supported by many compilers, it is not part of the ANSI-C standard and therefore may not always be portable. It may also cause minor performance problems: it leads to variable-size stack frames, so that both stack and frame pointers need to be managed (with fixed-size stack frames, one of these is redundant). Larger allocations may also increase the risk of undefined behavior due to a stack overflow. C99 offered variable-length arrays as an alternative stack allocation mechanism – however, this feature was relegated to optional in the later C11 standard.
- POSIX defines a function posix_memalign that allocates memory with caller-specified alignment. Its allocations are deallocated with free, so the implementation usually needs to be a part of the malloc library.

== See also ==
- Buffer overflow
- Memory debugger
- Memory protection
- Page size
- Variable-length array
