= Arbitrary code execution =

Cyber attack where any code can be run

In computer security, arbitrary code execution (ACE) is an attacker's ability to run any commands or code of the attacker's choice on a target machine or in a target process. An arbitrary code execution vulnerability is a security flaw in software or hardware allowing arbitrary code execution. A program that is designed to exploit such a vulnerability is called an arbitrary code execution exploit. The ability to trigger arbitrary code execution over a network (especially via a wide-area network such as the Internet) is often referred to as remote code execution (RCE or RCX).

== Vulnerability types ==
Several classes of vulnerability can allow a hacker to execute arbitrary commands or code. Examples include:

- Memory safety vulnerabilities such as buffer overflows or over-reads.
- Deserialization vulnerabilities
- Type confusion vulnerabilities
- GNU ldd arbitrary code execution

== Methods ==
Arbitrary code execution is commonly achieved through control over the instruction pointer (such as a jump or a branch) of a running process. The instruction pointer points to the next instruction in the process that will be executed. Control over the value of the instruction pointer therefore gives control over which instruction is executed next. In order to execute arbitrary code, many exploits inject code into the process (for example by sending input to it which gets stored in an input buffer in RAM) and use a vulnerability to change the instruction pointer to have it point to the injected code. The injected code will then automatically get executed. This type of attack exploits the fact that most computers (which use a Von Neumann architecture) do not make a general distinction between code and data, so that malicious code can be camouflaged as harmless input data. Many newer CPUs have mechanisms to make this harder, such as a no-execute bit.

=== Combining with privilege escalation ===
On its own, an arbitrary code execution exploit will give the attacker the same privileges as the target process that is vulnerable. For example, if exploiting a flaw in a web browser, an attacker could act as the user, performing actions such as modifying personal computer files or accessing banking information, but would not be able to perform system-level actions (unless the user in question also had that access).

After gaining the ability to execute arbitrary code, an attacker may attempt to exploit a privilege escalation vulnerability to gain additional control. This may involve the kernel itself or an account such as Administrator, SYSTEM, or root. With or without this enhanced control, exploits have the potential to do severe damage or turn the computer into a zombie—but privilege escalation helps with hiding the attack from the legitimate administrator of the system.

== Examples ==
Retrogaming hobbyists have managed to find vulnerabilities in classic video games that allow them to execute arbitrary code, usually using a precise sequence of button inputs in a tool-assisted superplay to cause a buffer overflow, allowing them to write to protected memory. At Awesome Games Done Quick 2014, a group of speedrunners managed to code and run versions of the games Pong, Snake and Super Mario Bros. on a copy of Super Mario World by utilizing an out-of-bounds read of a function pointer that points to a user controlled buffer to execute arbitrary code.

On May 1, 2018, a security researcher discovered an ACE vulnerability in the 7-Zip file archiver.

On June 12, 2018, Bosnian security researcher Jean-Yves Avenard of Mozilla discovered an ACE vulnerability in Windows 10.

PHP has been the subject of numerous ACE vulnerabilities.

On December 9, 2021, an RCE vulnerability called "Log4Shell" was discovered in popular logging framework Log4j, affecting many services including iCloud, Minecraft: Java Edition and Steam, and characterized as "the single biggest, most critical vulnerability of the last decade".

== See also ==
- BlueKeep
- Follina (security vulnerability)
