= Apport =

Apport may refer to:

- Apport (paranormal), the paranormal transference or appearance of an object
- Apport (software), a crash reporter for the Ubuntu operating system
- Apport (tribute), a kind of tribute payment in medieval Europe
