= Nm (Unix) =

Unix command

nm
- Original authors: Dennis Ritchie, Ken Thompson (AT&T Bell Laboratories)
- Developers: Various open-source and commercial developers
- Initial release: November 3, 1971; 54 years ago
- Written in: C
- Operating system: Unix, Unix-like, Plan 9
- Platform: Cross-platform
- Type: Command
- License: Plan 9: MIT License

nm is a Unix command used to dump the symbol table and their attributes from a binary executable file (including libraries, compiled object modules, shared-object files, and standalone executables).

The output from nm distinguishes between various symbol types. For example, it differentiates between a function that is supplied by an object module and a function that is required by it. nm is used as an aid for debugging, to help resolve problems arising from name conflicts and C++ name mangling, and to validate other parts of the toolchain.

This command is shipped with a number of later versions of Unix and similar operating systems including Plan 9. The GNU Project ships an implementation of nm as part of the GNU Binutils package.

The etymology is that in the old Version 7 Unix, nm's manpage used the term name list instead of symbol table.

== nm output sample ==
/*
 * File name: test.c
 * For C code compile with: 
 * gcc -c test.c
 *
 * For C++ code compile with:
 * g++ -c test.cpp
 */

int global_var;
int global_var_init = 26;

static int static_var;
static int static_var_init = 25;

static int static_function()
{
	return 0;
}

int global_function(int p)
{
	static int local_static_var;
	static int local_static_var_init=5;

	local_static_var = p;

	return local_static_var_init + local_static_var;
}

int global_function2()
{
	int x;
	int y;
	return x+y;
}

#ifdef __cplusplus
extern "C"
#endif
void non_mangled_function()
{
	// I do nothing
}

int main(void)
{
	global_var = 1;
	static_var = 2;

	return 0;
}

If the previous code is compiled with the gcc C compiler, the output of the nm command is the following:

# nm test.o
0000000a T global_function
00000025 T global_function2
00000004 C global_var
00000000 D global_var_init
00000004 b local_static_var.1255
00000008 d local_static_var_init.1256
0000003b T main
00000036 T non_mangled_function
00000000 t static_function
00000000 b static_var
00000004 d static_var_init

When the C++ compiler is used, the output differs:

# nm test.o
0000000a T _Z15global_functioni
00000025 T _Z16global_function2v
00000004 b _ZL10static_var
00000000 t _ZL15static_functionv
00000004 d _ZL15static_var_init
00000008 b _ZZ15global_functioniE16local_static_var
00000008 d _ZZ15global_functioniE21local_static_var_init
         U __gxx_personality_v0
00000000 B global_var
00000000 D global_var_init
0000003b T main
00000036 T non_mangled_function

The differences between the outputs also show an example of solving the name mangling problem by using extern "C" in C++ code.

Symbol types
Symbol type	Description
A	Global absolute symbol
a	Local absolute symbol
B	Global bss symbol
b	Local bss symbol
D	Global data symbol
d	Local data symbol
f	Source file name symbol
R	Global read-only symbol
r	Local read-only symbol
T	Global text symbol
t	Local text symbol
U	Undefined symbol

== See also ==
- objdump
- strings
