= GNU Binutils =

GNU software development tools for executable code

- Developer: GNU Project
- Stable release: 2.47 / 26 July 2026
- Type: Programming tools
- License: GNU GPLv3-or-later
- Website: www.gnu.org/software/binutils/
- Repository: sourceware.org/git/binutils-gdb.git

The GNU Binary Utilities, or binutils, is a collection of programming tools maintained by the GNU Project for working with executable code including assembly, linking and many other development operations.

The tools are originally from Cygnus Solutions.

The tools are typically used along with other GNU tools such as GNU Compiler Collection, and the GNU Debugger.

== Tools ==
As of 26 July 2026 the tools include:

addr2line	convert address to file and line
ar	create, modify, and extract from archives
as	assembler popularly known as GAS (GNU Assembler)
c++filt	demangling filter for C++ symbols
dlltool	creation of Windows dynamic-link libraries
elfedit	allows alteration of ELF format files
gold	alternative linker for ELF files
gprof	profiler
gprofng	collects and displays application performance data
ld	linker
nlmconv	object file conversion to a NetWare Loadable Module
nm	list symbols exported by object files
objcopy	copy object files, possibly making changes
objdump	dump information about object files
ranlib	generate indices for archives (for compatibility; same as ar -s)
readelf	display contents of ELF files
size	list section sizes and total size of binary files
strings	list printable strings
strip	remove symbols from object files
windmc	generates Windows message resources
windres	compiler for Windows resource files

== elfutils ==
Ulrich Drepper wrote elfutils, to partially replace GNU Binutils, purely for Linux and with support only for ELF and DWARF. It distributes three libraries with it for programmatic access.

== See also ==
- Binary File Descriptor library – GNU support for multiple executable file formats
- GNU Core Utilities – Collection of standard, Unix-based utilities from GNU
- GNU Debugger – Source-level debugger
- ldd (Unix) – Unix or Linux utility
- List of Unix commands
- LLVM – Compiler backend for multiple programming languages
- strace – Diagnostic, debugging and instructional userspace utility for Linux
