= Strip (Unix) =

Shell command for removing non-essential information from executable code files

strip
- Original authors: Dennis Ritchie (AT&T Bell Laboratories)
- Developers: Various open-source and commercial developers
- Release: June 12, 1972; 54 years ago
- Written in: C
- Operating system: Unix, Unix-like, Plan 9, Microsoft Windows
- Platform: Cross-platform
- Type: Command
- License: Plan 9: MIT License

strip is a shell command for removing information from binary executable programs and object files that is not required for execution – typically including debugging data, symbol tables, relocation information, and other metadata. The resulting file will have a smaller size. This is also known as a stripped binary.

Using strip can enhance the security of an executable by making it more difficult to reverse-engineer. The absence of symbol and debugging information complicates the program analysis of the binary.

The effect of strip can also be achieved via a compiler or linker to perform the same process. For example, in the GNU C compiler (gcc), this is done via the -s option.

strip (without any options) has been standardized under POSIX since X/Open Portability Guide Issue 2 (1987). The command is available in Unix, Plan 9, and Unix-like systems. The GNU Project includes an implementation in the GNU Binutils package. The command has been implemented in to other operating systems including Windows.

== Levels ==
POSIX defines the action of strip as "remove from strippable files named by the file operands any information the implementor deems unnecessary for execution of those files", which is intentionally vague. To resolve this vagueness, common implementations of strip (LLVM as used by FreeBSD and GNU Binutils as used by Linux) have the following options:

- To strip all debug sections but preserve everything else. This is --strip-debug.
- To strip symbols unneeded for relocation processing, most commonly relevant with libraries and position-independent executables, and all debug sections. This is --strip-unneeded.
- To strip compiler-generated local symbols indicated by a special naming convention. This is --debug-local.
- To strip all non-global symbols. This is --discard-all.
- To strip all symbols, debug sections and relocations. This is --strip-all in GNU and --strip-all-gnu in LLVM.

There are also additional features such as:

- To remove or keep a symbol or section of a specific name, or having a name that matches a specific regular expression.
- To only keep the debug information, allowing the result to serve as a dedicated debugging-information file (--only-keep-debug).

Many of these options can be used together when not contradictory (e.g. --strip-debug --discard-local).

Distinctions of global vs local and relocated vs non-relocated symbols are important in maintaining the functioning of dynamic libraries.

== See also ==
- Dead code elimination – Compiler optimization to remove code which does not affect the program results
- Debug symbol – Information to facilitate code debugging
- Executable compression – Means of compressing an executable file
- List of POSIX commands
- strings (Unix) – Shell command for extracting printable text from a binary file
- Symbol table – Data structure used by a language translator such as a compiler or interpreter
