= Fatal exception error =

Error that causes a program to abort

In computing, a fatal exception error or fatal error is an error that causes a program to abort (ABEND) and may therefore return the user to the operating system. When this happens, data that the program was processing may be lost. A fatal error is usually distinguished from a fatal system error (colloquially referred to in the MS Windows operating systems by the error message it produces as a "blue screen of death"). A fatal error occurs typically in any of the following cases:

- An illegal instruction has been attempted
- Invalid data or code has been accessed
- An operation is not allowed in the current ring or CPU mode
- A program attempts to divide by zero (only for integers; with the IEEE floating point standard, this creates an infinity instead).

In some systems, such as macOS and Microsoft Windows, a fatal error causes the operating system to create a log entry or to save an image (core dump) of the process.
