= Microsoft Tips =

Application bundled with the Microsoft Windows operating system

Tips
- Developer: Microsoft
- Release: 29 January 2015, 11 years ago
- Final release: 10.2312.1.0 / 9 November 2023; 2 years ago
- Operating system: Windows 10 to 11
- Predecessor: Help and Support Center
- Successor: Get Help
- Website: www.microsoft.com/en-us/store/p/get-started/9wzdncrdtbjj

Tips (formerly Welcome to Windows, Getting Started with Windows, Windows XP Tour, Welcome Center, Getting Started, Hints, and Get Started) is a series of tutorial hubs in Microsoft Windows that provides information about using features. Information is presented as screenshots, text descriptions, videos, and web links. As Windows upgrades have traditionally been drastic, each version since Windows 95 has had its own tutorial app, and the name has changed frequently. Notably, the feature list shown has tended to expand as newer versions of Windows are released and the most recently released tutorial receives updates through the Microsoft Store, allowing it to receive updates more frequently than Windows itself is upgraded.

== Evolution ==
Tips originated with a popup in Windows 95 named Welcome to Windows 95, a series of screens that resembled Windows Installer and introduced the user to the Start menu and dial-up networking. The popup appeared the first time a user logged into Windows. A nearly identical popup named Welcome to NT was included in the 1996 release of Windows NT 4.0. The Windows 98 version featured a new sidebar design and a cloud background. The contents were arranged into four categories: Register Now, Connect to the Internet, Discover Windows 98, and Maintain Your Computer.

In the Getting Started with Windows 2000 popup, the Maintain Your Computer section was removed and the Windows 2000 logo was added.

Windows Me replaced the static information popup with a much larger Flash-based narrated tutorial popup named Welcome to Windows Me. It began with a video and included four main sections: Digital Media, Rich Internet Experience, Home Networking, and Improved User Experience.

XP followed up with a larger Flash-based narrated tutorial called Windows XP Tour, which was also published online, with five sections: Best for Business, Safe and Easy Personal Computing, Unlock the World of Digital Media, The Connected Home and Office, and Windows XP Basics. While the narrator showed users around, music based on the XP theme played. The tour emphasizes Windows XP's then-new features but also explained basic features such as windowing and the Recycle Bin. When all sections are played in one session, the session lasts about 20 minutes.

Windows Vista replaced the Windows XP Tour with a Control Panel screen called Welcome Center that provided links to tools available to users, with an emphasis on setting up a new computer or using Vista for the first time. It was originally known as Welcome Center and opened at startup, although it could be disabled. Welcome Center informed users what edition of Vista they were using at the top and 21 links to other items at the bottom. Some of the links provided information at the top of the current screen, some opened other parts of the Control Panel, and some linked to the Internet. The 21 links included View computer details, Transfer files and settings, Add new users, Connect to the Internet, Windows Ultimate Extras, What's new in Windows Vista, Go online to learn about Windows Live, Go online to find it fast with Windows Live, Go online to help protect your PC with Windows Live, Go online to Windows Marketplace, Go online to find more ways to help protect your PC, and Sign up online for technical support.

Despite Welcome Center's emphasis on online features and add-ons, it was not designed for receiving frequent updates and has not been updated. As a result, it still links to the discontinued Windows Live, discontinued Windows Marketplace, discontinued Windows Ultimate Extras, and renamed Windows Live Search.

In Windows 7, Welcome Center was renamed Getting Started. Getting Started featured fewer links, and the links provided reflect the new features in Windows 7 and Windows Live in 2009. Get Started includes nine links: Go online to find what's new in Windows 7, Personalize Windows, Transfer files and settings from another computer, Use a homegroup to share with other computers in your home, Choose when to be notified about changes to your computer, Go online to get Windows Live Essentials, Back up your files, Add new users to your computer, and Change the size of the text on your screen. Getting Started does not start up automatically, but it is pinned to the Windows 7 Start menu.

In Windows 8, Getting Started was completely removed. Windows 8.1 introduced a new app called Help + Tips that was pinned to the Start screen. It features a primary screen with a search box six tiles that focus exclusively on features new to Windows 8: Start and apps, Get around, Basic actions, Your account and files, Settings, and What's new. The info in each tile's section is viewed with horizontal scrolling. In addition to the app, Windows 8.1 features hints for finding hidden navigation menus, buttons, and flyouts.

Windows 10's introductory app is called Get Started. The first few iterations featured a large, comprehensive hamburger menu with sidebar links for most major topics. Later iterations minimized the interface by including a welcome page with links to the Internet, a section for new topics, and a page with links to all topics in the app. It continues to receive updates from the Windows Store as Windows 10 apps and the system itself continue to change.

On April 10, 2017, in the Windows 10 Creators Update, Get Started was renamed to Tips.

Tips' interface is entirely different in Windows 10's Retail Demo Mode, which is used on Windows 10 PCs on display at stores. In Retail Demo Mode, Tips features a different set of information that informs the consumer about Windows 10, Microsoft Office, and sometimes the brand of the computer Tips is running on.

On November 7, 2023, Microsoft announced that Tips had been removed from the Microsoft Store and would no longer receive future updates. With the release of Windows 11 update 24H2, Microsoft stated that Tips had been removed from systems along with Cortana and WordPad on May 28, 2024, replaced by Get Help.
