= Memory-disk synchronization =

Memory-disk synchronisation is a process used in computers that immediately writes to disk any data queued for writing in volatile memory. Data is often held in this way for efficiency's sake, since writing to disk is a much slower process than writing to RAM. Disk synchronization is needed when the computer is going to be shut down, or occasionally if a particularly important bit of data has just been written.

In Unix-like systems, a disk synchronization may be requested by any user with the sync command.

== See also ==
- mmap, a POSIX-compliant Unix system call that maps files or devices into memory
- msync, a POSIX-compliant Unix system call that forcefully flush memory to disk and synchronize
