= STAP2 =

Protein-coding gene in the species Homo sapiens

Available structures
PDB	Ortholog search: PDBe RCSB
PDB	List of PDB id codes 2EL8

Identifiers
- Aliases: STAP2, BKS, signal transducing adaptor family member 2
- External IDs: OMIM: 607881; MGI: 2147039; HomoloGene: 9798; GeneCards: STAP2; OMA:STAP2 - orthologs

Gene location (Human)
Chr.	Chromosome 19 (human)
Band	19p13.3	Start	4,324,043 bp
Band	19p13.3	End	4,342,786 bp

Gene location (Mouse)
Chr.	Chromosome 17 (mouse)
Band	17|17 D	Start	56,304,077 bp
Band	17|17 D	End	56,312,584 bp
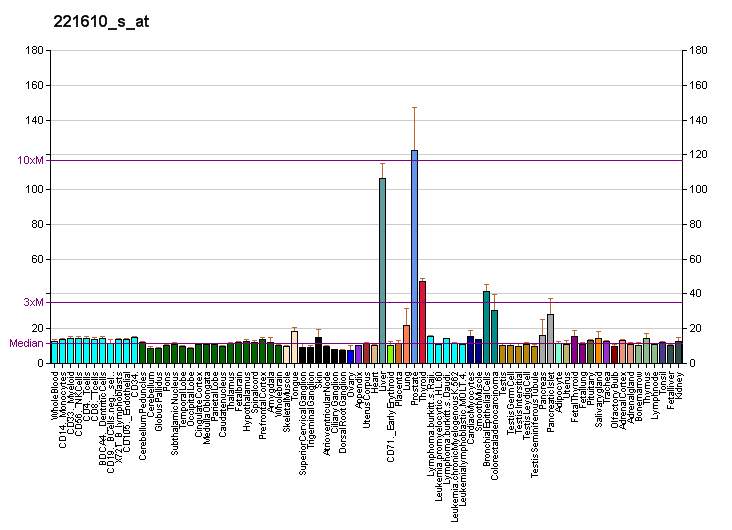
RNA expression pattern
Bgee	Human / Mouse (ortholog); Top expressed in: mucosa of transverse colon; mucosa of ileum; skin of abdomen; skin of leg; rectum; olfactory zone of nasal mucosa; mucosa of sigmoid colon; pancreatic ductal cell; right lobe of liver; minor salivary glands / Top expressed in: intestinal villus; jejunum; ileum; duodenum; parotid gland; epithelium of small intestine; large intestine; colon; crypt of lieberkuhn of small intestine; submandibular gland; More reference expression data
BioGPS	More reference expression data
Gene ontology
Molecular function	protein binding; signaling adaptor activity
Cellular component	cytoplasm; cytosol; plasma membrane
Biological process	positive regulation of tyrosine phosphorylation of STAT protein; positive regulation of signal transduction
Sources:Amigo / QuickGO
Orthologs
Species	Human	Mouse
Entrez	55620	106766
Ensembl	ENSG00000178078	ENSMUSG00000038781
UniProt	Q9UGK3	Q8R0L1
RefSeq (mRNA)	NM_001013841; NM_017720	NM_145934
RefSeq (protein)	NP_001013863; NP_060190	NP_666046
Location (UCSC)	Chr 19: 4.32 – 4.34 Mb	Chr 17: 56.3 – 56.31 Mb
PubMed search
- Wikidata
View/Edit Human	View/Edit Mouse

Signal-transducing adaptor protein 2 is a protein that in humans is encoded by the STAP2 gene.

This gene encodes the substrate of breast tumor kinase, an Src-type non-receptor tyrosine kinase. The encoded protein possesses domains and several tyrosine phosphorylation sites characteristic of adaptor proteins that mediate the interactions linking proteins involved in signal transduction pathways. Alternative splicing results in multiple transcript variants.

== Interactions ==
STAP2 has been shown to interact with PTK6.
