= Dump analyzer =

A dump analyzer is a programming tool which is used for understanding a machine readable core dump.

== GNU gdb ==
The GNU Debugger (gdb) can be used to look inside core dumps (called CORE) from various supported systems. Gdb is an interactive command-line debugger; various GUI front-ends can be run with gdb.

== IBM IPCS ==
IPCS (Interactive Problem Control System) is a z/OS component that can analyze un-formatted application dumps (SYSMDUMP), transaction dumps, system dumps (SVC dumps), stand-alone system dumps (SADMP) and the current address space. IPCS can inspect any storage address in the dump and format system control blocks, providing labels for fields. It can be run interactively or as a batch job. Authorized users can view other address spaces.

== IBM z/VM Dump Viewing Facility ==
“The Dump Viewing Facility provides a variety of commands and subcommands that allow the user to interactively locate and display dump data.”
