= Binary File Descriptor library =

GNU support for multiple executable file formats

- Original author: Cygnus Solutions
- Written in: C
- Platform: x86; ARM; DEC Alpha; LoongArch; M·CORE; MIPS; RISC-V; SPARC; AVR32; DLX; IA-64; m68k; SuperH; Xtensa; Zilog Z80
- Type: Library
- License: GNU General Public License
- Repository: sourceware.org/git/?p=binutils-gdb.git%3Ba%3Dtree%3Bf%3Dbfd

The Binary File Descriptor library (BFD) is the GNU Project's main mechanism for the portable manipulation of object files in a variety of formats. As of 2003, it supports approximately 50 file formats and 25 instruction set architectures.

== History ==
When David Henkel-Wallace of Cygnus Support proposed developing the library as a way to open up new business opportunities for the company, Richard Stallman said that it would be difficult; David's response was that it wasn't such a "Big Fucking Deal". Abbreviated to "BFD", this became the library name. "Binary File Descriptor" was invented later as a backronym for "BFD".

== Design ==
BFD works by presenting a common abstract view of object files. An object file has a "header" with descriptive info; a variable number of "sections" that each has a name, some attributes, and a block of data; a symbol table; relocation entries; and so forth.

Internally, BFD translates the data from the abstract view into the details of the bit/byte layout required by the target processor and file format. Its key services include handling byte order differences, such as between a little-endian host and big-endian target, correct conversion between 32-bit and 64-bit data, and details of address arithmetic specified by relocation entries.

BFD library can be logically divided into two parts. The front-end and the back-end. The front-end gives a common interface independent of underlying object file view. Users will be interacting with the object files with this interface. Even if the layout of the object files are not known to the user, the user would still be able to use the interface. This hiding of the detail is done with the help of the back-end. The back-end implements how the front-end interface interacts with the object files layout. Whenever a new object files type is introduced the back-end needs to register the type and implement it if it needs to be supported by the BFD application.

Although BFD was originally designed to be a generic library usable by a wide variety of tools, the frequent need to tinker with the API to accommodate new systems' capabilities has tended to limit its use; BFD's main clients are the GNU Assembler (GAS), GNU Linker (GLD), and other GNU Binary Utilities ("binutils") tools, and the GNU Debugger (GDB). As a result, BFD is not distributed separately, but is always included with releases of binutils and GDB. Nevertheless, BFD is a critical component in the use of GNU tools for embedded systems development.

The BFD library can be used to read the structured data out of a core dump.

== BFD library usage ==
Eg: Print object file size using bfd library APIs.

#include "bfd.h"
#include <stdio.h>

int main()
{
  bfd* abfd = bfd_openr("a.o", NULL); 
  printf("%llu\n", bfd_get_size(abfd));
  return 0;
}

Build command:

$ gcc main.c -lbfd -o output
$ ./output # prints the size
