= M·CORE =

Microcontroller architecture

M·CORE is a low-power, RISC-based microcontroller architecture developed by Motorola (subsequently Freescale, now part of NXP), intended for use in embedded systems. Introduced in late 1997, the architecture combines a 32-bit internal data path with 16-bit instructions, and includes a four-stage instruction pipeline. Initial implementations used a 360nm process and ran at 50 MHz.

M·CORE processors employ a von Neumann architecture with shared program and data bus—executing instructions from within data memory is possible. Motorola engineers designed M·CORE to have low power consumption and high code density.
