= Get Started =

Studio album by David Lindgren
- Released: 2012
- Recorded: 2012
- Genre: Pop
- Label: EMI Sweden

Singles from Get Started
- 1. ""Shout It Out"" Released: 2012

"Get Started" is the debut album of the Swedish singer David Lindgren. Released in 2012 on EMI Sweden, the 10-track album contains collaborations with Lazee.

== Track listing ==
1. "Rendezvous" (3:35)
2. "Hey!" (with Khoen) (3:41)
3. "Shout It Out" (3:05)
4. "Save Me Now" (3:30)
5. "Perfect Crime" (3:05)
6. "Get Started" (feat. Lazee & Nawuel) (3:08)
7. "Best Part" (3:40)
8. "On the Dancefloor" (3:23)
9. "Encore" (3:06)
10. "Shout It Out" (Acoustic Version) (3:13)

== Charts ==
=== Weekly charts ===
Chart (2012)	Peak position
Swedish Albums (Sverigetopplistan)	1

=== Year-end charts ===
Chart (2012)	Position
Swedish Albums (Sverigetopplistan)	46
