= PTK6 =

Protein-coding gene in the species Homo sapiens

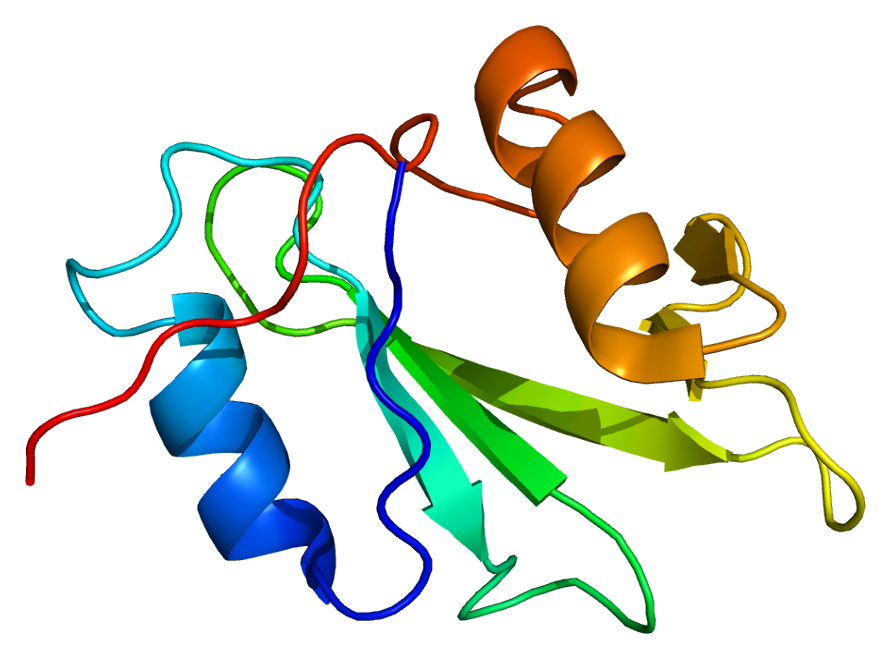

Identifiers
- Aliases: PTK6, BRK, protein tyrosine kinase 6
- External IDs: OMIM: 602004; MGI: 99683; GeneCards: PTK6
Available structures
| PDB | Ortholog search: PDBe RCSB |
| PDB | List of PDB id codes 1RJA, 2KGT |
Enzyme activity
| EC # | BRENDA | ExPASy | KEGG | MetaCyc |
|---|---|---|---|---|
| 2.7.10.2 | ↗ | ↗ | ↗ | ↗ |

Gene location (Human)
| Chr. | Chromosome 20 (human) |
| Band | 20q13.33 | Start | 63,528,001 bp |
| Band | 20q13.33 | End | 63,537,376 bp |

Gene location (Mouse)
| Chr. | Chromosome 2 (mouse) |
| Band | 2 H4|2 103.62 cM | Start | 180,835,514 bp |
| Band | 2 H4|2 103.62 cM | End | 180,844,582 bp |
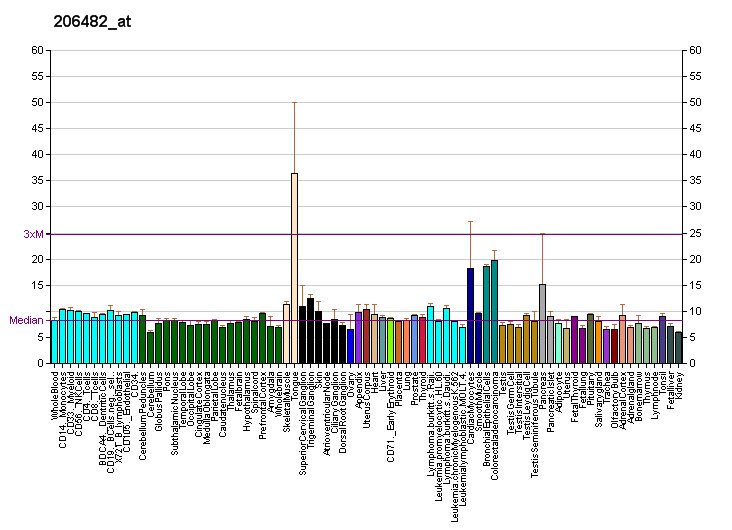
RNA expression pattern
| Bgee | Human / Mouse (ortholog); Top expressed in: mucosa of transverse colon; human penis; skin of abdomen; skin of leg; mucosa of pharynx; gums; amniotic fluid; gingival epithelium; oral cavity; jejunal mucosa / Top expressed in: jejunum; esophagus; lip; intestinal villus; blastocyst; skin of external ear; tongue; ileum; Ileal epithelium; duodenum; More reference expression data |
| BioGPS | More reference expression data |
Gene ontology
| Molecular function | transferase activity; nucleotide binding; protein kinase activity; non-membrane spanning protein tyrosine kinase activity; kinase activity; protein binding; identical protein binding; signaling receptor binding; ATP binding; protein tyrosine kinase activity |
| Cellular component | cytoplasm; cell projection; membrane; ruffle; extrinsic component of cytoplasmic side of plasma membrane; nucleus; nucleoplasm; cytosol; plasma membrane; nuclear body |
| Biological process | cellular response to retinoic acid; negative regulation of growth; phosphorylation; transmembrane receptor protein tyrosine kinase signaling pathway; protein phosphorylation; negative regulation of protein tyrosine kinase activity; regulation of cell population proliferation; intestinal epithelial cell differentiation; positive regulation of neuron projection development; peptidyl-tyrosine autophosphorylation; protein autophosphorylation; innate immune response; cell migration; positive regulation of cell cycle; ERBB2 signaling pathway; negative regulation of signal transduction; positive regulation of epidermal growth factor receptor signaling pathway; tyrosine phosphorylation of STAT protein; positive regulation of tyrosine phosphorylation of STAT protein; cell differentiation |
Sources:Amigo / QuickGO
Orthologs
| Databases | NCBI: entry; OMA: entry |
| Species | Human | Mouse |
| Entrez | 5753 | 20459 |
| Ensembl | ENSG00000101213 | ENSMUSG00000038751 |
| UniProt | Q13882 | Q64434 |
| RefSeq (mRNA) | NM_001256358; NM_005975 | NM_009184; NM_001356304 |
| RefSeq (protein) | NP_001243287; NP_005966 | NP_033210; NP_001343233 |
| Location (UCSC) | Chr 20: 63.53 – 63.54 Mb | Chr 2: 180.84 – 180.84 Mb |
| PubMed search |
- Wikidata
| View/Edit Human | View/Edit Mouse |

Tyrosine-protein kinase 6 is an enzyme that in humans is encoded by the PTK6 gene.

== Function ==
Tyrosine-protein kinase 6—also known as BRK (breast tumor kinase)—is a cytoplasmic non-receptor protein kinase which may function as an intracellular signal transducer in epithelial tissues. The encoded protein has been shown to undergo autophosphorylation.

== Clinical significance ==
Overexpression of this gene in mammary epithelial cells leads to sensitization of the cells to epidermal growth factor and results in a partially transformed phenotype. Expression of this gene has been detected at low levels in some breast tumors but not in normal breast tissue.

== Interactions ==
PTK6 has been shown to interact with STAP2 and KHDRBS1.
