= Strings (Unix) =

Shell command for extracting printable text from a binary file

strings
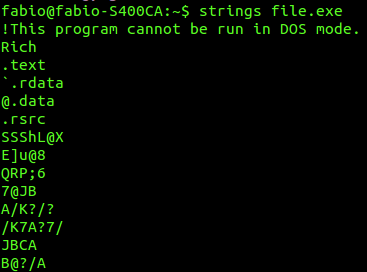
- The strings command
- Written in: C
- Operating system: Unix, Unix-like, Plan 9, Inferno
- Platform: Cross-platform
- Type: Command
- License: Plan 9: MIT License

strings is a shell command that extracts printable character strings from a file – which is particular useful for analyzing the content of a binary file. By definition, a binary file contains data that is not printable text yet a binary file often does contain some printable character text – often in relatively short sequences distributed throughout the file. These portions of the binary file can be informative as to what the file contains overall. For a text file, a file containing all printable characters, the command prints the entire file content, and therefore, provides no utility over more commonly used file output commands such as cat.

The command searches for sequences of printable characters that end with a NUL character but ignores any sequence that is less than a specified length or 4 characters by default. Some implementations provide options for determining what is recognized as a printable character, which is useful for finding non-ASCII and wide character text. By default, it only selects strings from the initialized and loaded sections of an object file. For other types of files, it selects strings from the whole file.

The command is available in Unix, Plan 9, Inferno, and Unix-like systems. It is part of the GNU Binary Utilities (binutils), and has been implemented in other operating systems including Windows.

== Example ==
The following command searches the system's BIOS for strings that are at least 8 characters long:

dd if=/dev/mem bs=1k skip=768 count=256 2>/dev/null | strings -n 8

== See also ==
- GNU Debugger – Source-level debugger
- List of POSIX commands
- Paste (Unix) – Shell command for joining files horizontally
- Strip (Unix) – Shell command for removing non-essential information from executable code files
