= Ldd (Unix) =

Unix or Linux utility

ldd (List Dynamic Dependencies) is a *nix utility that prints the shared libraries required by each program or shared library specified on the command line. It was developed by Roland McGrath and Ulrich Drepper. If some shared library is missing for any program, that program won't come up.

== Security ==
ldd is a shell script that executes the program given as argument, and shouldn't be used with untrusted binaries. The ldd manual page suggests to use the following command using the objdump and grep utilities as alternative:

user@home ~/ $ objdump -p /path/program | grep NEEDED

== Usage examples ==
user@home ~/ $ ldd /usr/bin/mp3blaster
        linux-vdso.so.1 =>  (0x00007fff8fdff000)
        libsidplay.so.1 => /usr/lib/libsidplay.so.1 (0x00007f4ea98ec000)
        libvorbisfile.so.3 => /usr/lib/libvorbisfile.so.3 (0x00007f4ea96e4000)
        libvorbis.so.0 => /usr/lib/libvorbis.so.0 (0x00007f4ea94b6000)
        libncurses.so.5 => /lib/libncurses.so.5 (0x00007f4ea9273000)
        libpthread.so.0 => /lib/libpthread.so.0 (0x00007f4ea9056000)
        libstdc++.so.6 => /usr/lib/libstdc++.so.6 (0x00007f4ea8d41000)
        libm.so.6 => /lib/libm.so.6 (0x00007f4ea8abe000)
        libgcc_s.so.1 => /lib/libgcc_s.so.1 (0x00007f4ea88a7000)
        libc.so.6 => /lib/libc.so.6 (0x00007f4ea8523000)
        libogg.so.0 => /usr/lib/libogg.so.0 (0x00007f4ea831c000)
        libdl.so.2 => /lib/libdl.so.2 (0x00007f4ea8118000)
        /lib64/ld-linux-x86-64.so.2 (0x00007f4ea9b59000)
user@home ~/ $ ldd /usr/lib/i386-linux-gnu/libstdc++.so.6.0.20
        linux-gate.so.1 (0xb7733000)
        libm.so.6 => /lib/i386-linux-gnu/i686/cmov/libm.so.6 (0xb75da000)
        libc.so.6 => /lib/i386-linux-gnu/i686/cmov/libc.so.6 (0xb742f000)
        /lib/ld-linux.so.2 (0xb7734000)
        libgcc_s.so.1 => /lib/i386-linux-gnu/libgcc_s.so.1 (0xb7411000)
