= Get Help =

Troubleshooting software developed by Microsoft

- Get Help in Windows 10 / Windows 11
- Developer: Microsoft
- Stable release: September 2024 Update (10.2409.42652) / November 1, 2026; 3 days ago
- Operating system: Windows 10, 11
- Type: Support

Get Help, known as Contact Support before the Windows 10 Creators Update, is a built-in interface for communicating with Microsoft customer service employees over the Internet. The opening screen requests that the user specify a product and explain a problem with it. It also offers the user links to online help articles for business and IT support, Microsoft Store sales and support, and a disability answer desk.

Once a problem has been entered, the user is offered a chance to review that and select a product from the following icon-based list:

- Windows
- Office
- Xbox
- Skype
- OneDrive
- Store
- Excel
- PowerPoint
- Word
- Outlook
- OneNote
- Azure
- Band
- Rewards
- Business, IT & developer
- Dynamics
- Edge
- Exchange server
- HealthVault
- HoloLens
- Minecraft Education
- Mobile devices
- Mouse, keyboard
- MSDN Subscriptions
- MSN
- Outlook.com
- SharePoint server
- SQL Server
- Surface
- Visio
- Visual Studio

After the user has selected a product category, the next screen presents links for solving the problem, device information, a call link with an estimated wait time, a scheduler, and a screen for chatting with an agent by instant message.

Previously, like Quick Assist, Get Help was updated through Windows Update, not Microsoft Store, even though Get Help is built from the Universal Windows Platform. However, since the Windows 10 20H2 update, Get Help can now be updated through the Microsoft Store.

== See also ==
- help (command)
