= PowerPlant =

PowerPlant is an object-oriented GUI toolkit, application framework and set of class libraries for the Classic Mac OS, created by Metrowerks. The framework was fairly popular during the late (OS versions 8 and 9) Classic Mac OS era, and was primarily used with CodeWarrior. It was designed to work with a GUI editor called Constructor, which was primarily a resource editor specializing in UI elements. Constructor used several custom resource types, 'PPob' ("PowerPlant object"—a general view description), 'CTYP' (custom widgets), and Mcmd (used for dispatching menu-related events). Later it was ported to also support MacOS X development with a single code base.

After Metrowerks was acquired by Motorola, then spun out as part of Freescale Semiconductor, PowerPlant and the rest of the CodeWarrior desktop development tools were discontinued.

During its heyday from the mid-1990s until the early 2000s, PowerPlant was the most popular framework available for Mac programmers, replacing both the THINK Class Library and MacApp as the premier object-oriented toolkit for the MacOS; however, the transition to MacOS X was rather difficult for many PowerPlant programmers. In 1997, there was no plan to port PowerPlant to the Yellow Box API found on Rhapsody, a radically different API that would become Cocoa, the official MacOS X API. Instead Metrowerks plan was to port PowerPlant using Codewarior Latitude, a Mac to UNIX porting library they acquired recently. In 2000, as Apple revised its transition plans, PowerPlant was ported to Carbon, with the Aqua user interface on MacOS X, offering a solution for developers wanting to support the new operating system.

A new version, PowerPlant X, was introduced in 2004 as a native Carbon framework, using Carbon Events but never became as popular on Mac OS X as PowerPlant had been on Classic Mac OS.

In February 2006, the PowerPlant class libraries were released as open source under the BSD license hosted on SourceForge. Although it could theoretically be recompiled for x86-64 Macs, it is Carbon-dependent and therefore can only be used in 32-bit mode, which preclude its use for software to run on macOS Catalina or later as 32-bit application support was dropped by the system.
