= TechCamp =

TechCamp may refer to:

- Tech camp, a summer camp which focuses on technology education
- Office of eDiplomacy, which runs a program known as TechCamp
