= THINK C =

Extension of ANSI C for the classic Mac OS

Think C
- Other names: LightSpeed C
- Original author: Michael Kahl
- Developers: Think Technologies, Symantec
- Operating system: MacOS
- Platform: Motorola 68000 series
- Successor: Symantec C/C++
- Type: Software development tool
- License: Proprietary

Think C (stylized as THINK C), originally known as LightSpeed C, is an extension of the C programming language for the classic Mac OS developed by THINK Technologies, released first in mid-1986. THINK was founded by Andrew Singer, Frank Sinton and Mel Conway. LightSpeed C was widely lauded when it was released, as it used the Macintosh user interface throughout and was extremely fast. It quickly became the de facto C environment on the Mac, and the related Think Pascal quickly did the same for Object Pascal development.

THINK Technologies was later bought by Symantec Corporation and the product continued to be developed by the original author, Michael Kahl. Versions 3 and later were essentially a subset of C++ and supported basic object-oriented programming (OOP) concepts such as single inheritance, and extensions to the C standard that conformed more closely to the needs of Mac OS programming. After version 6, the OOP facilities were expanded to a full C++ implementation, and the product was rebranded Symantec C++ starting version 7, then under development by different authors. Version 8 brought support for compiling to PowerPC.

Think's almost complete ownership of the Mac programming market was broken with the introduction of the PowerPC-based Macs in the early 1990s. Although Symantec released updates that ran on these platforms, these were not released until the machines had been on the market for almost a year. In the meantime, Metrowerks' product, CodeWarrior, took control of the market, being both faster and easier to use than Think's.

Starting with version 4.0, Think included the Think Class Library (TCL), a class library and framework for Mac programming that ran under both Think C and Think Pascal. This largely replaced MacApp as the de facto class library for Mac programming. Like Think C, this remained a market leader until the release of Metrowerks' PowerPlant, which was generally regarded to be superior. During the early-1990s, Think and Apple collaborated on a cross platform library known as Bedrock, but this effort was abandoned in 1993, by which time PowerPlant was the clear market leader.

Despite the decline in popularity of their IDE, Symantec was eventually chosen by Apple to provide next-generation C/C++ compilers for MPW in the form of Sc/Scpp for 68K alongside MrC/MrCpp for PowerPC. These remained Apple's standard compilers until the arrival of Mac OS X replaced them with the GNU Compiler Collection (GCC). Symantec subsequently exited the developer tool business.

== THINK Reference ==
THINK Reference is a proprietary documentation database and browser developed by Symantec for programmers on the classic Mac OS platform. It was included with the THINK C development environment sold by Symantec, and previously included with THINK Pascal. It contains a hypertext version of Apple Computer's Macintosh Toolbox API specifications, along with illustrative code samples.

THINK Reference was discontinued in 1994.

== Reception ==
Bruce F. Webster of BYTE named Lightspeed C product of the month for September 1986. While criticizing the documentation as its "single greatest weakness", Webster stated that Lightspeed C would be the choice if he had to select one compiler for the Macintosh. BYTE in 1989 listed Lightspeed C as among the "Distinction" winners of the Byte Awards, stating that it "wins our respect because of its powerful features and low price".

THINK C 5.0 obtained in 4 (out 5) rating in July 1992 issue of Macworld, praising a fast compilation and an outstanding development environment, despite an insufficient documentation.

Symantec C++ 8.0 obtained a 3 (out 5) rating in July 1995 issue of Macworld, comparing favourably the speed and size of its PowerPC compiled code with that of CodeWarrior at the time, but noting its heavy memory requirements and its comparative lack of customer support.
