= Application framework =

Framework in computer software

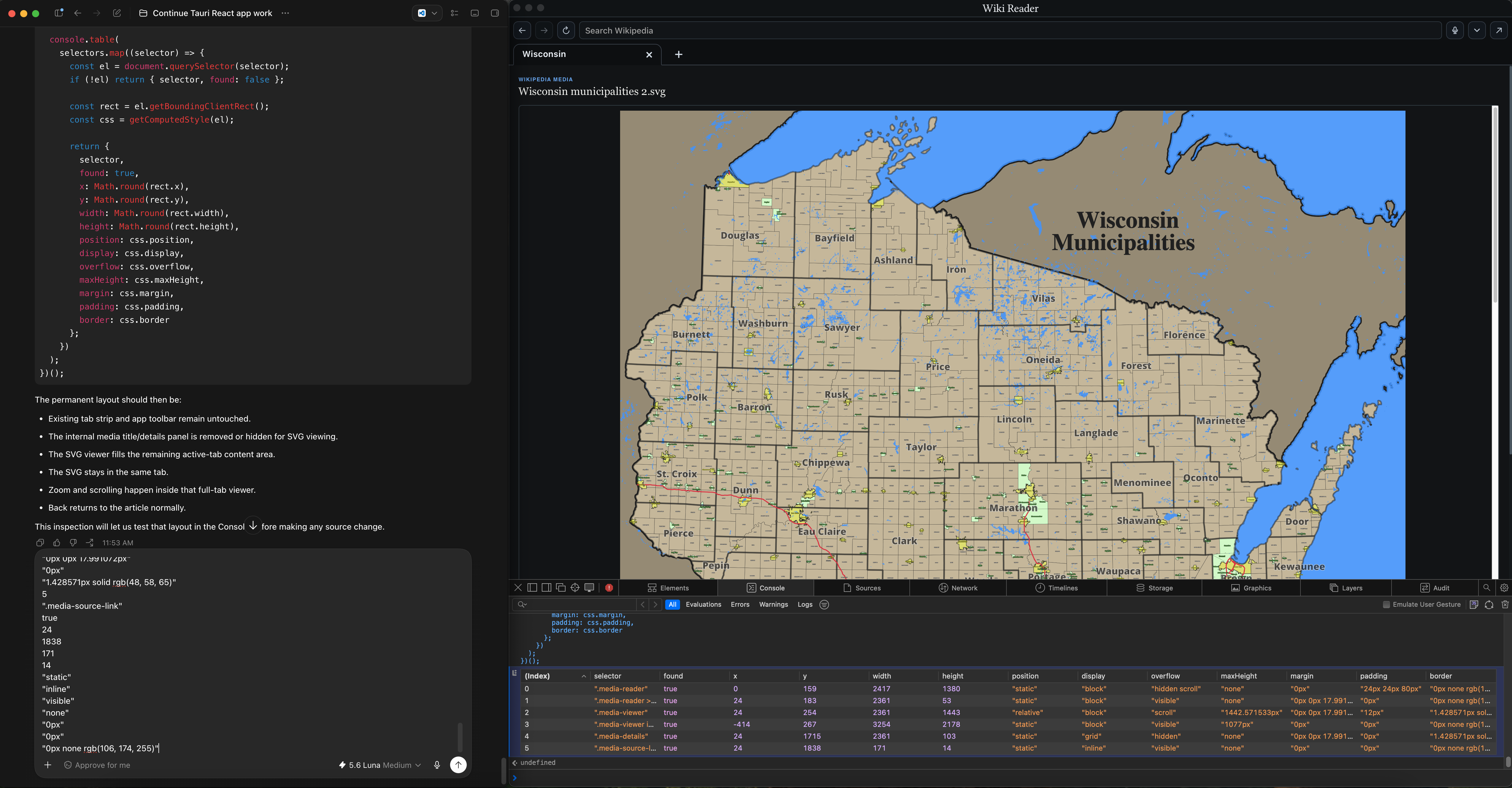
Tauri application framework working with OpenAI Codex and using the DOM inspector

In computer programming, an application framework consists of a software framework used by software developers to implement the standard structure of application software.

Application frameworks became popular with the rise of graphical user interfaces (GUIs), since these tended to promote a standard structure for applications. Programmers find it much simpler to create automatic GUI creation tools when using a standard framework, since this defines the underlying code structure of the application in advance. Developers usually use object-oriented programming (OOP) techniques to implement frameworks such that the unique parts of an application can simply inherit from classes extant in the framework.

== Examples ==
Apple Computer developed one of the first commercial application frameworks, MacApp (first release 1985), for the Macintosh. Originally written in an extended (object-oriented) version of Pascal termed Object Pascal, it was later rewritten in C++. Another notable framework for the Mac is Metrowerks' PowerPlant, based on Carbon. Cocoa for macOS offers a different approach to an application framework, based on the OpenStep framework developed at NeXT.

Since the 2010s, many apps have been created with the frameworks based on Google's Chromium project. The two prominent ones are Electron and the Chromium Embedded Framework.

Free and open-source software frameworks exist as part of the Mozilla, LibreOffice, GNOME, KDE, NetBeans, and Eclipse projects.

Microsoft markets a framework for developing Windows applications in C++ called the Microsoft Foundation Class Library, and a similar framework for developing applications with Visual Basic or C#, named .NET Framework.

Several frameworks can build cross-platform applications for Linux, Macintosh, and Windows from common source code, such as Qt, wxWidgets, Juce, Fox toolkit, or Eclipse Rich Client Platform (RCP).

Oracle Application Development Framework (Oracle ADF) aids in producing Java-oriented systems.

Silicon Laboratories offers an embedded application framework for developing wireless applications on its series of wireless chips.

== See also ==
- List of open-source application frameworks
