= Jasik Debugger =

Debugger tool for the classic Mac OS

The Jasik Debugger (or more correctly, The Debugger from Jasik Designs), was a debugger tool for the classic Mac OS. Pitched as a much more powerful alternative to Macsbug, it was a popular choice among professional Mac developers until the advent of more advanced source-level debuggers such as that built into Metrowerks Codewarrior. This debugger first appeared in the late 1980s and was usually referred as MacNosy.

"MacNosy" because it had a built-in powerful code-path tracer and disassembler. One could point it at an entry point into the code and MacNosy would disassemble code from that point down and follow calls and jumps and disassemble those sections too. When it reached a computed jump, it could find the associated jump table and then disassemble from those pointed-to locations. The command syntax for doing this was a bit obscure, but it could be made to work. In this way one could disassemble large programs, such as the Turbo Pascal compiler.

While Jasik's debugger featured a graphical user interface, it was laid out in a very arbitrary and peculiar way, with buttons seemingly randomly sized and positioned. This gave it a reputation as difficult to use.
