= Clascal =

Object-oriented programming language

- Paradigms: Imperative, structured, object-oriented
- Family: Wirth Pascal
- Developers: Apple Computer
- First appeared: 1983; 42 years ago
- Typing discipline: Static and dynamic (dynamic typing through variants, array of const, and RTTI), strong, safe
- Scope: Lexical (static)
- Platform: Motorola 68000 series

Influenced by
- Pascal, Simula, Smalltalk

Influenced
- Object Pascal

Clascal is an object-oriented programming language (and associated discontinued compiler) developed in 1983 by the Personal Office Systems (POS) division (later renamed The Lisa Division, then later The 32-Bit Systems Division) of Apple Computer. Clascal was used to program applications for the Lisa Office System, the operating environment of the Lisa.

Developed as an extension of Lisa Pascal, which in turn harked back to the UCSD Pascal model originally implemented on the Apple II, the language was strongly influenced by the Xerox Palo Alto Research Center (PARC) release of Smalltalk-80, v1 (which had been formerly ported to the Lisa), and by Modula. According to Larry Tesler, Clascal was developed as a replacement for Apple's version of Smalltalk, which was "too slow" and because the experience offered by the Smalltalk syntax was too unfamiliar for most people.

Clascal was the basis for Object Pascal on the Apple Macintosh in 1985. With the demise of the Lisa in 1986, Pascal and Object Pascal continued to be used in the Macintosh Programmer's Workshop for systems and application development for several more years, until it was finally supplanted by the languages C and C++. The MacApp application framework was based on Toolkit originally written in Clascal.

Object Pascal, in turn, served as the basis for Borland's Delphi.
