= Denison Bollay =

American software engineer

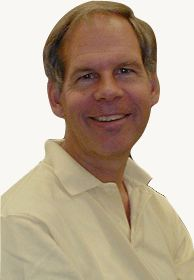
- Denison Bollay, 2007
- Born: 1952 (age 72–73)
- Other names: Denny
- Occupation(s): Software engineer Programmer; Startup entrepreneur
- Years active: 1975–present
- Known for: ExperTelligence, 3DStockCharts.com, ExperClick (AdECN), BuddyCast, Computer Camp
- Notable work: ExperLogo, ExperLisp, Interface Builder, Action!, DynamicDocuments, WebBase, WebData

Denison Bollay (born 1952) is a software engineer working on programming languages and search algorithms, with applications for e-commerce and financial information.

== History ==
In 1975, Bollay became an early quant (before the term was invented), computing real-time option pricing. Real-time stock and option data was so new, he had to design and build his own hardware to interface his Data General Eclipse computer with the Bunker Ramo machine and ticker.

Bollay is the author of ExperLogo and ExperLisp, the first incrementally compiled object-oriented programming languages for a personal computer, the Apple Macintosh. He introduced the world to the first Interface Builder in 1986, and the first dynamic interface building tool Action! in 1988. He was also the creator of DynamicDocuments in 1988, the first object-oriented, multimedia hypertext system (built in the language Lisp), WebBase, the first dynamic web server in 1995, and WebData (a database of databases web portal).

In 1999, he founded ExperClick, the first real-time internet auction market. The company's name was changed to AdECN in 2006. It was sold to Microsoft in August 2007.

He spun off a subsidiary, 3DStockCharts in 2000. It provided the first integrated real-time ECN stock market book in visual 3D graphics.

Bollay was awarded US patent 6457009, Bollay, Denison W., "Method of searching multiple internet resident databases using search fields in a generic form", issued 2002-09-24. He has many pending patents. He founded ExperTelligence in 1984, 3DStockCharts.com in 1999, ExperClick in 2000, and became Chairman of MicroMLS in 2004. He founded and still operates a wireless internet service provider Kiza, Inc. in Southern California in 2014.

He is also one of the authors (with Mel Beckman and Brian Fox) of the BuddyCast peer-to-peer streaming media protocol.

== Computer Camp ==
In 1980, Denison Bollay created The Original Computer Camp, an outdoor tech camping experience for kids. It included horseback riding, campfires, and a hundred computers, including the Apple II, Atari 8-bit computers, TRS-80, and TI-99/4A. There were robots, turtles (silicon based), and synthesized computer music. It was featured on the front page of The Wall Street Journal, launching a trend that encouraged thousands of children to become interested in software.

He graduated from Harvey Mudd College in 1974.
