= Publish and Subscribe (Mac OS) =

Document linking model introduced by Apple Computer in System 7

Publish and Subscribe was a document linking model introduced by Apple Computer in System 7. Named the Edition Manager in developer documentation, it extended the existing cut and paste editing model with a notification system; "subscribers" could include parts of "published" documents within themselves, and changes to the original published document would be noticed and updated by the subscribers. To the user the system was very similar to cut and paste in concept; material would be selected from the source document and published, creating an edition file, then placed into the subscriber by selecting that clipping file and positioning it inside the document.

In general terms the concept was very similar to Microsoft's Object Linking and Embedding 1.0 system. Unlike OLE, the Edition Manager was comparatively complex from a programming standpoint. Suffering from second system effect, it included features intended to make it better than OLE, including support for non-rectangular areas, network notifications and an extensive user interface. A result of this complexity was poor uptake among developers, and applications providing Publish and Subscribe were few and far between. One of the few products to use it effectively was Claris's suite of software, including ClarisWorks which had already built a system somewhat similar in concept, but required extensive changes to make its own system work with OpenDoc.

At the time many in the industry felt that the Publish and Subscribe concept was the "next big thing". Apple and Microsoft were not the only two companies trying to introduce such a system; most major software vendors attempted to introduce similar systems, and NeXTSTEP included a version. However users did not find the system useful. Further it was sometimes confusing to use; if the document included live links it was no longer possible to simply copy it to a floppy disk (for instance), the clipping file had to be copied as well. In addition, opening their applications to new component developers who would compete to provide the best editors was not attractive to large corporations such as Microsoft and Adobe.

== See also ==
- Publish–subscribe pattern – Messaging pattern in which senders and receivers do not directly communicate
- Distributed version control – Software engineering tool
