= Gnulib =

Collection of software subroutines

- Developer(s): GNU Project
- Repository: git.savannah.gnu.org/cgit/gnulib.git
- Written in: C
- Operating system: GNU
- Type: GNU portability library
- License: GNU General Public License
- Website: www.gnu.org/software/gnulib/

Gnulib, also called the GNU portability library, is a collection of software subroutines which are designed to be usable on many operating systems. The goal of the project is to make it easy for free software authors to make their software run on many operating systems. Since source is designed to be copied from gnulib, it is not a library per-se, as much as a collection of portable idioms to be used in other projects.

Making a software package work on a system other than the original system it worked on is usually called "porting" the software to the new system, and a library is a collection of subroutines which can be added to new programs. Thus, Gnulib is the GNU project's portability library.

It is primarily written for use by the GNU Project, but can be used by any free software project.

== See also ==
- GLib
- libiberty
- Boost (C++ libraries)
