= National Computer Camps =

- Type: Private
- Industry: Campground Operating
- Founded: 1977; 49 years ago in Connecticut
- Founder: Dr. Michael Zabinski
- Website: nccamp.com

National Computer Camps are computer camps for children and teens founded in 1977 by Dr. Michael Zabinski. There are locations at Fairfield University in Fairfield, Connecticut, where Dr. Zabinski is an emeritus professor of physics and engineering; Oglethorpe University in Atlanta, Georgia; and Baldwin Wallace University in Cleveland, Ohio.

The focus of NCC is 2D and 3D video game design, computer programming, digital video production, web page design, A+ and Network+ certification, Android App programming, and software applications including animation, Flash and Photoshop. An optional sports program is also available. Each week, all levels of programming are offered in Basic, C++, Java, assembler, HTML, XML, and JavaScript. Campers may attend one or multi-week sessions.

NCC was the first summer camp for children founded with a primary focus on computing.
