= Devil Dice =

1998 video game

- PAL box art
- Developer: Shift (Note: Additional work by Sony Computer Entertainment Japan.)
- Publishers: WW: Sony Computer Entertainment; NA: THQ
- Director: Hiroyuki Kotani
- Producer: Tomikazu Kirita
- Designer: Yuichi Sugiyama
- Programmers: Masahiko Wada; Shuichi Yano
- Artist: Seiji Yamagishi
- Composer: Kemmei Adachi
- Platform: PlayStation
- Release: JP: June 18, 1998; NA: September 24, 1998; EU: January 15, 1999
- Genre: Puzzle
- Modes: Single-player, multiplayer

Devil Dice, known in Japan as XI, pronounced [sai], is a puzzle video game developed by Shift and published by Sony Computer Entertainment for the PlayStation. It was released in Japan in 1998 and Europe in 1999, and by THQ in North America in 1998. The game is a million-seller and a demo version was released as a PlayStation Classic game for the PlayStation 3 and PlayStation Portable (PSP) on 7 November 2007.

== Gameplay ==
Screenshot of gameplay

Devil Dice is a unique puzzle video game, where the player controls a small devil that runs around a grid covered in large dice. The player can both stand atop dice, and stand on the ground (with the dice towering above). When standing on the dice, the player can move from die to die, or can roll a die in the direction they run, revealing a different face as the die rotates. Creating a group of adjacent dice with identical pips—the size of which must be at least the number of pips—causes those dice to slowly sink into the field before disappearing. Chain reactions are possible by adding additional dice to a sinking set. Different types of dice are available in some modes, with different properties to make the game more challenging.

The game features the following modes:

- Battle - pits the player against a single computer opponent, both attempting to build up chains and negate those of the opponent.
- Puzzle - mode in which players must solve puzzles (i.e., clear all dice) using only a limited number of steps or moves. Solving a whole row of puzzles allows players access to a picture that they can play on in Battle mode.
- Trial - the standard arcade-style mode, where the objective is to remove as many dice as possible (and thus score as many points as possible) before the grid completely fills with dice.
- Wars - quickfire multiplayer mode, supporting up to four simultaneous computer opponents, or five human players when using a multitap. Players damage each other as they complete chains, with the last man standing becoming the winner.

== Development ==
According to lead designer Yuichi Sugiyama, Devil Dice was created for Game Yarōze, a Japan-exclusive competition where participants competed for access to a development environment for the creation of PlayStation games intended for commercial release. The original program was held between 1995 and 1999, with over 3,000 participants and 1,200 submitted game concepts. Ultimately, over thirty Game Yarōze titles went to market, including Devil Dice and the first Doko Demo Issyo game. One of the Devil Dice programmers, Shuichi Yano, stated that he was a successful applicant of the Game Yarōze program; he further stated that the program is unrelated to the similarly-named Net Yarōze program.

== Reception ==
Reception

Aggregate score
Aggregator	Score
GameRankings	79%

Review scores
Publication	Score
AllGame	3.5/5
CNET Gamecenter	7/10
Edge	8/10
Electronic Gaming Monthly	8.875/10 (Note: In Electronic Gaming Monthly's review of the game, two critics gave it each a score of 9/10, another gave it 9.5/10, and one more critic gave it 8/10.)
Famitsu	30/40
Game Informer	8.25/10
GameSpot	6.9/10
IGN	9/10
Next Generation	4/5
Official U.S. PlayStation Magazine	3.5/5
Dengeki PlayStation	75/100, 85/100, 85/100, 90/100
The PlayStation	80/100, 58/100, 95/100

Devil Dice received favorable reviews according to the review aggregation website GameRankings. Both GamePro and Next Generation were positive to the game despite noting its high difficulty. (Note: GamePro gave the game 3.5/5 for graphics, 3/5 for sound, and two 4/5 scores for control and fun factor.) In Japan, Famitsu gave it a score of 30 out of 40.

Famitsu reported that the title sold over 131,815 units in its first week on the market and approximately 864,844 units during its lifetime in Japan. GamesTM regarded it as one of "10 Underrated PlayStation Gems".

The game won the award for both "Best Puzzle Game" and "Best Multiplayer Game" at the 1998 OPM Editors' Awards. Hyper later named Devil Dice a second runner-up for "1999 Hyper Reader Awards" for "Best Puzzle Game", which went to Bust-A-Move 99 for PlayStation and Nintendo 64.

== Sequels ==
XI Jumbo was only released in Japan exclusively on PlayStation.

A demake titled XI Little was only released in Japan exclusively on the WonderSwan Color by Bandai in 2001. It is the first portable video game based on a Sony Computer Entertainment property.

Bombastic (XI Go in Japan) was released in Japan, North America and Europe exclusively on PlayStation 2. It incorporates all play modes from previous releases.

Xi Coliseum was only released in Japan exclusively on PlayStation Portable. This version includes support for ad hoc wireless play between up to five players.
