= Net Yaroze =

Development kit for the PlayStation

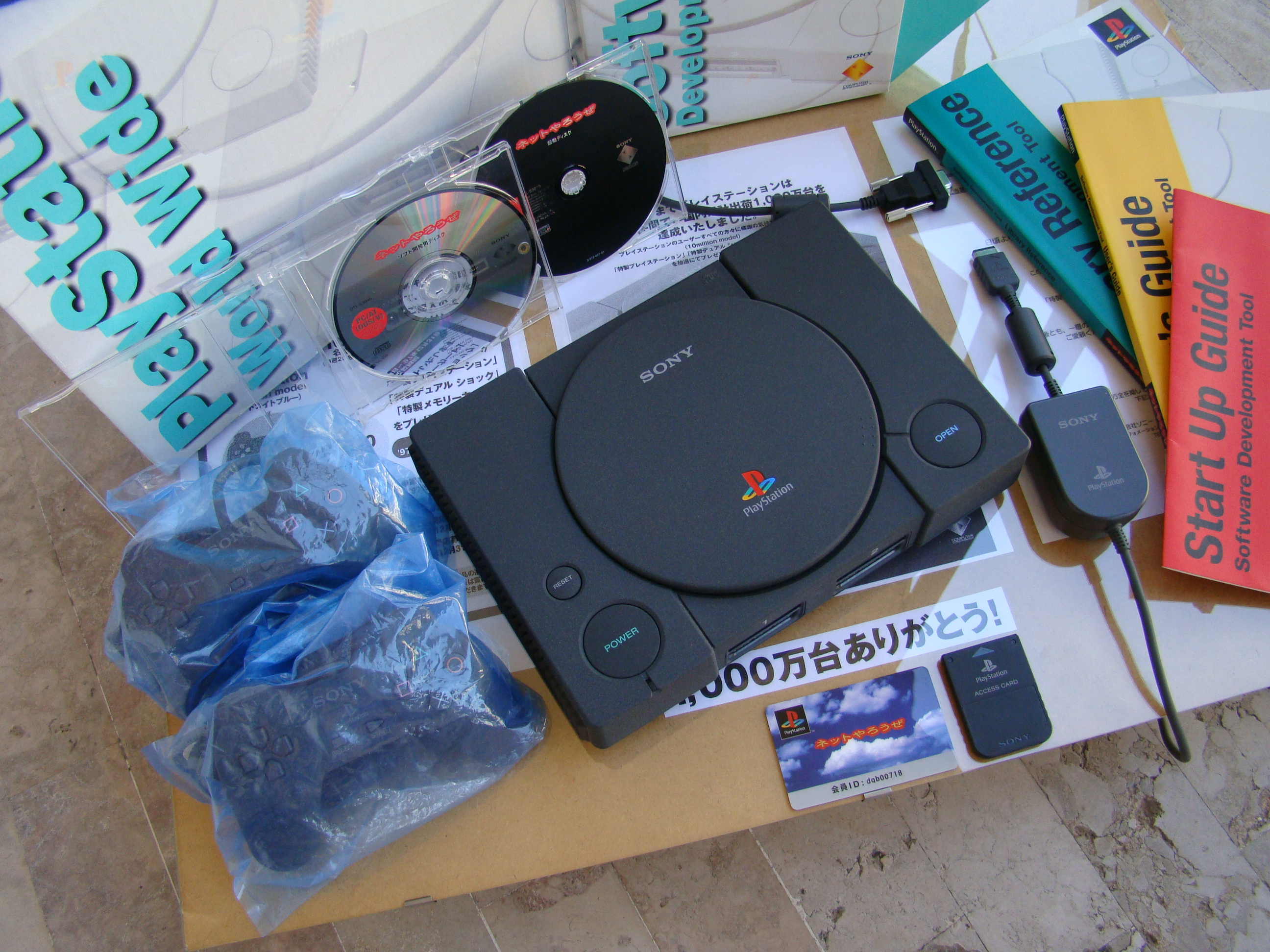
Sony Net Yaroze with software development kit

The Net Yaroze (ネットやろうぜ, Netto Yarōze) is a development kit for the PlayStation video game console. It was a promotion by Sony Computer Entertainment to computer programming hobbyists which launched in June 1996 in Japan and in 1997 in other countries. It was originally called Net Yarouze, but was changed to Net Yaroze in late 1996. Yarōze means "Let's do it together". The official Net Yaroze online community and servers were officially shut down by Sony Computer Entertainment in mid-2009, ending over 12 years of official support for the hobbyist platform.

Conceived by PlayStation creator Ken Kutaragi and priced at around $750 US, the Net Yaroze (DTL-H300x) package contained a special black-colored debugging PlayStation unit, a serial cable for connecting the console to a personal computer, and a CD containing PlayStation development tools. The user has to provide a personal computer (an IBM PC compatible or Macintosh; NEC PC-9801 was also supported in Japan) to write the computer code, compile it, and send the program to the PlayStation.

The Net Yaroze was neither the first nor only official consumer console development kit. The PC Engine Develo predates it, and the WonderWitch followed it. The GP32 can run user programs out of the box. Finally, many earlier consoles (Astrocade, Famicom) offered limited programming capabilities with BASIC dialects. Net Yaroze had no direct successors on subsequent PlayStation platforms, but Sony's Linux for PlayStation 2 and YA-BASIC offered a similar feature to hobbyists and amateur developers on the PlayStation 2 console.

== Contents ==
Net Yaroze system requirements
Requirement	Requirements
PC
Operating system	IBM PC compatible or Macintosh
CPU	66Mhz
Memory	4MB
Free space	10MB
Graphics hardware	SVGA monitor compatible
Sound hardware	None
Network	28.8kb/s

The Net Yaroze kit contains the following items:

- The Net Yaroze PlayStation console, which is identical to a standard PlayStation console except that it has different boot ROMs, lacks a regional lockout, uses a different encryption scheme, and is black.
- 2 PlayStation controllers (black matte texture)
- The Net Yaroze key disc, required to boot programs which were loaded from a PC.
- The Access Card, a dongle which must be placed in memory card port 1 in order to boot programs which were loaded from a PC.
- A CD-ROM containing development tools. The tools included vary according to version, but invariably include a C compiler, a compiler assembler, a linker, a debugger, tools for converting graphic and sound files to PlayStation format, and programming libraries.
- The Communications Cable, a special serial cable used to link the console and the computer.
- "Start Up Guide", "Library Reference", and "User's Guide" manuals. These document the programming libraries and PlayStation-specific development, but do not give instructions on how to program; the Net Yaroze kit assumes the user has basic programming knowledge.

== Versions ==
Though it lacked regional lockout, the Net Yaroze console exists in three variations: one for Japan, one for North America and one for Europe and Australia. The Europe/Australia version boots in PAL mode, while the others boot in NTSC mode. There are further differences between the Japanese kit and the others; the manuals are in Japanese, the software for Japanese PCs is included, and the discs and access card sticker have different printing. The Japanese version is sometimes unofficially referred to as DTL-3000 rather than DTL-H3000.

The Net Yaroze was only available for purchase by mail order; but Sony also provided it to universities in the UK, France (EPITA), and Japan.

Additionally, a version of CodeWarrior for PlayStation was released for both Windows and Macintosh in October 1996. LightWave 3D was another consumer-level PlayStation development tool.

The Net Yaroze lacks many of the features the official PlayStation Software Developers Kit provided, such as advanced hardware debugging, special software, certain libraries, and Sony's extensive technical support (including BBS and live telephone support). Dedicated Usenet groups, with access restricted to Net Yaroze members, were maintained by Sony; homepage hosting was also provided. The access was restricted according to the kit's region of origin, which made collaboration between users in different territories impractical.

The Yaroze's primary RAM was the same as the consumer's model (2 megabytes). Game code, graphics, audio samples and run-time libraries were limited to fit in the 2 MB of primary RAM, 1 MB of VRAM, and 0.5 MB of sound RAM, since the Net Yaroze will not play user-burned CDs, a necessary restriction in order to prevent piracy and ensure that the Yaroze program would not compete with the PlayStation's professional software development kit. This however, was not a problem for licensed developers who owned the official SDK. There are many commercial PlayStation titles (such as Devil Dice, long mistaken as a Net Yaroze game) that can be entirely RAM-resident, and have been developed with the Net Yaroze, while using the CD strictly to spool Red Book audio (CD-DA).

== Games produced ==
Screenshot from Hover Racing, one of the games developed for Net Yaroze and released on demo discs

Sony set up an online forum where users could share their homemade games, swap programming tips, and ask questions to Sony technical support staff. Many games made by hobbyists on the Net Yaroze were released on various demo discs that came along with the Official UK PlayStation Magazine (as well as other official PlayStation magazines in PAL regions) from 1997 to 2004. The last Official UK PlayStation Magazine issue, number 108, featured a compilation with many Net Yaroze games. A promotional disc, limited to a thousand copies and featuring a number of user-developed games, was produced by SCEE and sent to PAL-zone Yaroze owners. This disc can only be played on a Net Yaroze since it requires the access card included with the system to work.

Some of these games were based on arcade classics such as Mr. Do and Puzzle Bobble, while others (e.g. Time Slip) were illustrations of a novel concept. The Game Developer UK Competition, organized by Scottish Enterprise in collaboration with the Scottish Games Alliance, Sony and Edge in 1998, accepted Net Yaroze entries; the overall winner was Chris Chadwick for his game Blitter Boy – Operation: Monster Mall. An updated version of Time Slip was later released for Xbox Live Arcade in February 2011 and Windows in January 2012. Some of the system's developers moved into the games industry; Fatal Fantasy and Terra Incognita developer Mitsuru Kamiyama became director of the Final Fantasy Crystal Chronicles series at Square Enix. Magic Castle by Kaiga was pitched to various publishers but went unreleased until it was distributed online in 2021 by one of the original staff members.
