= Bombastic (video game) =

2002 video game

- North American box art
- Developer: Shift (Note: Additional work by Sony Computer Entertainment Japan.)
- Publishers: JP: Sony Computer Entertainment; WW: Capcom
- Platform: PlayStation 2
- Release: JP: December 19, 2002; NA: August 26, 2003; EU: January 16, 2004
- Genre: Puzzle
- Modes: Single-player, multiplayer

Bombastic, known in Japan as XI Go (XIゴ), is a 2002 puzzle video game developed by Shift and published by Sony Computer Entertainment for the PlayStation 2. It was released outside Japan by Capcom. It is the sequel to Devil Dice.

== Gameplay ==
Bombastic has similar gameplay to its predecessor, Devil Dice. The players controls a family of small devils (Aqui) that must traverse a level seen in isometric perspective that contains several standard six-sided dice. Players can walk on the ground, moving dice by pushing them, or walk on top of the dice, which rolls them onto the next face as the character walks. There are various gameplay modes, which determine the level objective and how dice are cleared.

=== Bombastic Style ===
Bombastic Style is a gameplay mode new to this title. When a group of adjacent dice has the same number of pips on their upper face, and the group consists of at least as many dice as the number of pips on that face, the dice start glowing, and after a while, explode and shoot flames in four directions. The larger the pip value, the longer the delay and the longer the flames. Dice can still be rolled or moved when glowing.

If a flame hits dice with equal or one pip fewer than the original die they also explode. With this chain rule, a player can form continuous explosions.

==== Trial Mode ====
Trial Mode has three submodes:

Standard: the player must keep clearing space in a 7x7 grid to survive, whilst the player's character gradually speeds up.

Limited: the player has three minutes in which to score as many points as possible.

Attack: ten stages with varying objectives, such as obtaining the most points in a fixed time, obtaining combos in a fixed time or clearing all dice in the shortest time.

==== Quest Mode ====
Quest Mode is an adventure over several levels, when Aqui brothers journey through 15 levels in 5 realms on the way to their grandfather, with each realm having a final boss to defeat.

Each level usually has various puzzles, all of which must be completed to progress. Touching an enemy character causes the player to lose a life. When all lives are lost they are replenished but progress on the current level is forfeited.

There are additional rewards for completing levels without losing any lives and for killing every enemy in the level without losing any lives.

The bosses at the ends of realms must be defeated by the blasts from exploding dice. Each boss has a unique ability.

Night-time stages are easier than their daytime counterparts.

==== War Mode ====
In War Mode, five players or computer-controlled players compete in a large grid to destroy dice and reduce the health of the other players. The last player alive wins.

=== Classic & Advanced styles ===
As progress is made in the game, styles can be unlocked.

Classic style follows the rules of Devil Dice; when a group of dice with identical top face is formed, which the size must be at least as the number of pips on the face, the dice start to sink to the grid and cannot be moved. When the dice has sunk halfway, they become "transparent". Dice can be rolled on top of these transparent dice (and the transparent dice vanishes immediately). Matching a die to a group of sinking dice will cause a chain; the new die starts sinking along with the original group.

Advanced style follows the rules of XI (sai) Jumbo; it adds the ability to jump with a die, allowing it to move atop the other dice and create combos more easily. It also allows the player to pick up an adjacent die; they can place it down into an adjacent space with the top face unchanged, or throw the die far and cause it to land on a random side.

==== Battle Mode ====
This mode replaces the Quest mode and is only available for the Classic and Advanced styles. It is a head-to-head mode where two players compete to "claim" different sides of dice by creating dice connections of those sides quickly. Depending on what was decided beforehand, the winner is decided when a player claims from three to all six sides first. Before a player reaches this goal, an opponent can "steal" a player's claim by making a connection of dice with the claimed number.

== Reception ==
Reception

Aggregate score
Aggregator	Score
Metacritic	72/100

Review scores
Publication	Score
Edge	7/10
Electronic Gaming Monthly	8/10
Eurogamer	8/10
Famitsu	32/40
Game Informer	8/10
GameRevolution	C+
GameSpot	7.1/10
GameSpy	3/5
GameZone	8.2/10
IGN	8.5/10
Official U.S. PlayStation Magazine	2.5/5

The game received "average" reviews according to the review aggregation website Metacritic. In Japan, Famitsu gave it a score of 32 out of 40.
