= Programmer's key =

Macintosh System Switch

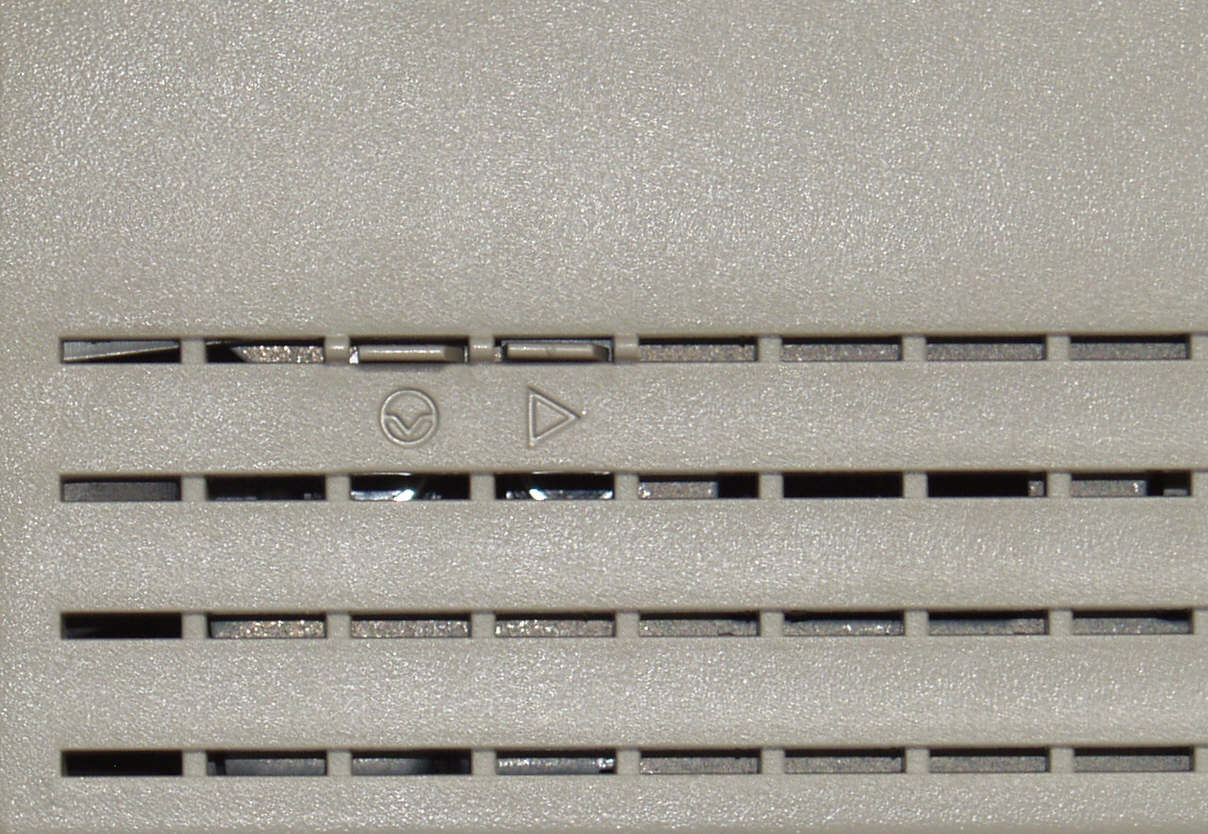
The interrupt button/programmer's key protruding from the air vent on the left-hand side of an Apple Macintosh Classic II computer (on the left, above the circular symbol)

The programmer's key, or interrupt button, is a button or switch on Classic Mac OS-era Macintosh systems, which jumps to a machine code monitor. The symbol on the button is ⎉: U+2389 ⎉ CIRCLED HORIZONTAL BAR WITH NOTCH. On most 68000 family based Macintosh computers, an interrupt request can also be sent by holding down the command key and pressing the power key on the keyboard. This effect is also simulated by the 68000 environment of the Mac OS nanokernel on PowerPC machines and the Classic environment.

Pressing the interrupt button during startup crashes the system and displays the Sad Mac.

A plastic insert came with Macintosh 128K, Macintosh 512K, Macintosh Plus, and Macintosh SE computers that could be attached to the exterior of the case and was used to press an interrupt button located on the motherboard.

Modern Mac hardware no longer includes the interrupt button, as the macOS operating system has integrated debugging options. In addition, macOS's protected memory blocks direct patching of system memory (in order to better secure the system).

== See also ==
- Interrupt
- Context switch
- MacsBug
