= Wireless Valley =

Wireless Valley is a term that was coined by Professor Ted Rappaport in 1990 when he was a faculty member at Virginia Tech, and was used to describe the Roanoke/Blacksburg, Virginia region and the potential of research to create spin-out companies. In 1990 he and his students founded TSR Technologies, a company that made software-defined cellular and paging intercept and drive test equipment that was sold to Allen Telecom in 1993, and in 1995 Wireless Valley Communications, a company that pioneered the creation of computer-aided wireless network prediction and management software that was sold to Motorola in late 2005. This term was later used as nickname to describe several regional clusters of companies in the information technology sector, in analogy to California's Silicon Valley:

- One such cluster is located in northern Stockholm, Sweden. This also included a number of companies that saw themselves as belonging to the new information based economy. Ericsson, the telecommunications supplier, has one of its main design centers in the Stockholm suburb of Kista.
- Finland also has a high-tech area in Espoo, sometimes called "Wireless Valley", based on Nokia and Nokia Siemens Networks. There is a secondary hub located in Oulu which is the base for other wireless specialist companies too.
- A third such cluster consists of the telecommunications formed in San Diego, based on Qualcomm
- A new high-tech program has been initialed in Nanjing, China, called 'China Wireless valley'. It is based on two national key laboratories of Southeast University.
