= MacsBug =

Low-level debugger, originally for Motorola 68000

- The MacsBug debugger interface
- Developers: Motorola, Apple Computer
- Release: 1979; 47 years ago
- Stable release: 6.6.3 / September 14, 2000; 26 years ago
- Operating system: Classic Mac OS
- Platform: 680x0 and PowerPC
- Type: Debugger
- Website: web.archive.org/web/20010414230104/http://developer.apple.com/tools/debuggers/MacsBug/

MacsBug (originally MACSbug) is a low-level (assembly language/machine-level) debugger for the classic Mac OS operating system. MacsBug is an acronym for Motorola Advanced Computer Systems Debugger, as opposed to Macintosh debugger (The Motorola 68000 Microprocessor is imprinted with the MACSS acronym). The original version was developed by Motorola as a general debugger for its 68000 systems. — it was ported to the Mac as a programmer's tool early in the project's development.

MacsBug is invoked by hitting the Macintosh's "Programmer's Key" or, as it became later known, the "Interrupt Key" or by pressing "Command-Power". MacsBug offers many commands for disassembling, searching, and viewing data as well as control over processor registers. MacsBug is not installed by default with Mac OS, although every Macintosh since the Macintosh Plus includes a debugger in ROM known as MicroBug.

Users who stumble into MacsBug by accident need only to enter G and press return to escape from MacsBug; however, MacsBug is not installed by default, requiring a system extension, so a typical user environment does not include it. However, it was occasionally installed by end users to provide very basic error recovery. As the classic Mac OS lacked memory protection, "hard crashes" where an application crash simply froze the entire system were not uncommon. With MacsBug installed, instead of an unresponsive system, the user would be dumped into MacsBug, where they could type ES to Exit to Shell (force quit the crashed application and return to the Finder) or RB for ReBoot, which restarted the system. Such recovery efforts were often not successful, with the only alternative a hard reset.

In Mac OS versions 7.5 and later, the presence of MacsBug is indicated at startup; it is present if the user sees the text Debugger installed (although, occasionally, this may indicate the presence of another piece of software loaded into the area of memory reserved for the debugger, instead).

MacsBug was originally for the Motorola 68000 series of processors only. When Apple introduced the Power Macintosh in 1994, it was followed by an updated MacsBug that supported the PowerPC instruction set and architecture.

The last version of MacsBug was 6.6.3, released September 14, 2000. This final version works with all of the machines released in the July–September timeframe of 2000, including the Power Mac G4 (uni- and multi-processor), Power Mac G4 Cube, the iMac family (Ruby, Indigo, Sage, Graphite, and Snow), and the iBook family (Indigo, Key Lime, and Graphite).

6.6.3 includes better support for debugging MP tasks, and fixes some serious bugs in the memory setting commands when used in PCI I/O space. It can also be used in Classic when running under Mac OS X, where it is invoked by pressing "⌘-⏏" (or "⌘-F12" on systems without an Eject key).

Mac OS X allows programmers to use familiar MacsBug commands in gdb. This gdb plugin is included with the OS X Developer Tools, located in the directory /usr/libexec/gdb/plugins/MacsBug/.

Third party alternatives to MacsBug included ICOM Simulations' TMON which came with the Darin Adler Extended User Area & Trap Discipline (allowing all documented Mac API parameters to be verified) and the fully symbolic Jasik debugger, which was much more powerful, but harder to use due to the intricate and non-standard user interface.

== Versions ==
- 1979 Motorola 68000 Design Module debugger
- January 25, 1982 - Adapted by Rich Page for Lisa & Mac.
- November 1, 1984 - Enhanced by Steve Capps.
- May 13, 1985 - Version IV+ by Ken Krugler.
- May, 1986 - Version 5.1 by Dan Allen.
- November 21, 1986 - Disassembler upgraded by Ira Reuben.
- June 15, 1987 - Version 5.4 by Dan Allen.
- March 31, 1988 - Version 5.6.1 by Dan Allen.
- June 29, 1988 - Version 6.0 by Michael Tibbott.
- April 20, 1989 - Version 6.1 by Michael Tibbott.
- September 14, 2000 - Version 6.6.3.
