= Tech camp =

Summer camp that focuses on technology education

A tech camp is a summer camp which focuses on technology education, sometimes referred to as a computer camp. These camps often include programs such as video game design, robotics, and programming. These camps first began to appear in the United States in the late 1970s. National Computer Camps was the first computer camp established in 1977.
