= Metrowerks =

Former software development company

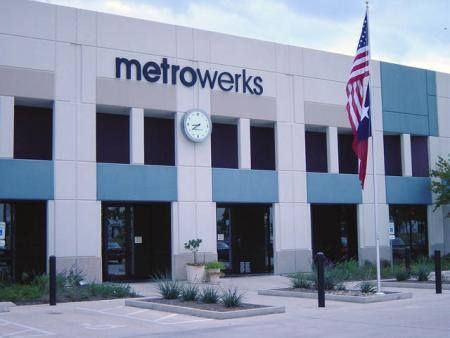
- Headquarters in Austin, Texas, in 2001
- Industry: Software
- Founded: 1985
- Founder: Greg Galanos
- Fate: Acquired by Motorola in August 1999
- Headquarters: Austin, Texas, United States
- Key people: Greg Galanos (Founder/President/CTO) and Jean Belanger (Chairman/CEO)
- Products: CodeWarrior

Metrowerks was a company that developed software development tools for various desktop, handheld, embedded, and gaming platforms. Its flagship product, CodeWarrior, comprised an IDE, compilers, linkers, debuggers, libraries, and related tools. In 1999 it was acquired by Motorola and in 2005 it was spun-off as part of Freescale, which continues to sell these tools. In 2015, Freescale Semiconductor was absorbed into NXP.

== History ==
Founded by Greg Galanos in 1985 as Metropolis Computer Networks in Hudson, Quebec, Metrowerks originally developed software development tools for the Apple Macintosh and UNIX workstations. Its first product was a Modula-2 compiler originally developed by Niklaus Wirth, the creator of the ALGOL W, Pascal and Modula-2 programming languages. It had limited success with this product. In 1992, it began an effort to develop development tools for Macintosh computers based on the newly announced PowerPC processor as well as legacy support for 68k chipsets. It shipped the first commercial release of CodeWarrior in May 1994 at Apple's Worldwide Developers Conference. The release was a great success. Metrowerks received much credit for helping Apple succeed in its risky transition to a new processor.

In March 1994 Metrowerks had its initial public offering, trading under the symbol MTWKF (NASDAQ foreign exchange) and continued to trade on Canadian exchanges.

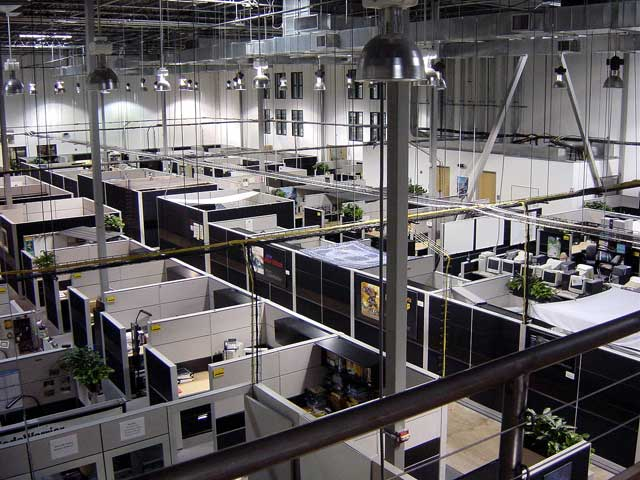
Metrowerks HQ - Austin, TX (circa 2002)

Also in 1994, Metrowerks opened a small sales and R&D office in Austin, Texas to be closer to the manufacturers of the new PowerPC chips, IBM and Motorola. Metrowerks later moved its corporate headquarters to Austin along with Greg Galanos (Founder/President/CTO) and Jean Belanger (Chairman/CEO).

By 1996 Metrowerks had begun expanding its CodeWarrior product line to target platforms besides Macintosh computers, including:

- Mac OS PowerPC
- Mac OS 68k
- General Magic's Magic Cap OS
- BeOS
- Microsoft Windows x86
- NEC v8xx, VRxxxx
- General MIPS (ISA I-IV)
- General PowerPC embedded
- General 68k embedded
- General Coldfire embedded
- General ARM embedded
- PlayStation, PS2 and PSP
- Nintendo 64, GameCube, Nintendo DS and Wii
- Sega Saturn
- Java tools
- Nokia SymbianOS (toolchain sold to Nokia in late 2004)
- PalmPilot

In 1997, Metrowerks acquired the principal assets of The Latitude Group Inc., a software compatibility layer to port Macintosh applications to UNIX systems, with the intent to use it to port CodeWarrior to run on Solaris, and to extend it to facilitate porting MacOS software to Rhapsody. This will result in the creation of CodeWarrior Latitude.

In August 1999, Motorola's semiconductor sector (Motorola Semiconductor Products Sector, or SPS) acquired Metrowerks for roughly $100 million in cash. After the acquisition, Jean Belanger moved to become VP of business development in SPS and after a short stint as Director of Software Strategy for SPS, Greg Galanos left to become a General Partner and Managing Director at SOFTBANK Venture Capital, known as Mobius Venture Capital since December 2001. David Perkins, previously SVP of Business Development at Metrowerks, assumed the title of President and CEO. Metrowerks subsequently acquired a small number of other companies including HIWARE AG, Embedix and Applied Microsystems Corp. in November 2002 for US$40-Million. In 2002, David Perkins assumed the role of Corporate Vice President of NCSG at Motorola SPS; Jim Welch (previously the CFO of Metrowerks) assumed the role of CEO. In late 2003, Jim Welch left to become CEO of Wireless Valley Communications and Matthew R. Harris (who was previously CEO of Lineo and Embedix) became the new CEO of Metrowerks.

In 2003, Motorola spun off its semiconductor group as a separate company named Freescale Semiconductor.

In late 2004, Nokia purchased the SymbianOS development tools, including members of the engineering, for US$30-Million.

In early 2005, Matt Harris left Metrowerks to become CEO of Volantis at which time Freescale management decided to absorb Metrowerks completely and not treat it as a wholly owned subsidiary.

CodeWarrior for Mac OS had successfully made the transition to Apple's new Mac OS X operating system, supporting the Carbon development environment. However, Apple invested heavily in their own development tools for OS X (Xcode), distributed free of charge and always up to date. The increasing prominence of the Cocoa development environment marginalized CodeWarrior, and finally the surprise announcement of the Mac's switch to Intel processors – mere weeks after Freescale had sold the Metrowerks Intel compiler tools to Nokia – signalled the end of CodeWarrior on the Mac. In July 2005, Freescale discontinued CodeWarrior for Mac OS, as the same time it was also divesting from any tools targeting non-Freescale silicon.

In October 2005, Freescale retired the Metrowerks name but continues to develop CodeWarrior and other developer technologies as part of Freescale's Developer Technology Organization.

Metrowerks' logo of the iconic factory worker and other visual branding was created by illustrator Bill Russell

Addendum: Freescale's website now says, "CodeWarrior for Mac OS has been discontinued and is no longer sold or supported." It has several downloadable updates, but the most recent modification date is 15 August 2005.

== Former Corporate Addresses ==
- 8920 Business Park Drive, Austin, TX 78759, USA
- 3925 West Braker Lane, Austin, TX, 78759, USA
- 2201 Donley Drive Suite 310, Austin, TX 78758, USA
- 2601 McHale Court, Austin, TX 78758, USA (Warehouse)
- 9801 Metric Boulevard, Austin, TX 78758, USA
- 7700 West Parmer Lane, Austin, TX 78753, USA

== CodeWarrior ==
Starting in 1994, CodeWarrior was the main product from Metrowerks. It was an Integrated Development Environment for Classic MacOS, that offered C/C++ and Pascal, targeting both 68k and PowerPC. Java support was added in 1996.

CodeWarrior for PalmPilot was the IDE in the early days of the device, limited to the C compiler with partial C++ support. Constructor for PalmPilot looked familiar to PowerPlant Constructor users.

CodeWarrior was the default toolchain for BeOS. Initially, developers on a BeBox could either use the command line tool provided, or cross-compile using the Macintosh IDE, until Metrowerks developed the BeIDE as part of CodeWarrior for BeOS.

Later CodeWarrior was ported to run on Windows for Win32 development (with MFC), and compilers started targeting embedded platforms.
