= Computer humour =

Humour about computers and their users

Computer humour, also known as hacker humour, is humour on the subject of computers or their users.

== Examples ==
Examples of computer humour include:

- "Any key", taken to mean pressing the (non-existent) "Any" key rather than any key
- April Fools' Day Request for Comments
- Bastard Operator From Hell, a fictional rogue computer operator
- Blinkenlights, a neologism for diagnostic lights
- Bogosort, a portmanteau of the words bogus and sort
- COMEFROM, an obscure programming language control flow structure, originally as a joke
- "The Complexity of Songs", a journal article published by computer scientist Donald Knuth in 1977 as an in-joke about computational complexity theory
- The Computer Contradictionary, a non-fiction book by Stan Kelly-Bootle that compiles a satirical list of definitions of computer industry terms
- The Daily WTF, a humorous blog dedicated to "Curious Perversions in Information Technology"
- Dilbert, an American comic strip
- Easter egg, an intentional inside joke, hidden message or image, or secret feature of a work
  - List of Google Easter eggs
  - List of Easter eggs in Microsoft products
  - The Book of Mozilla
- Elephant in Cairo, in computer programming, a piece of data inserted at the end of a search space, which matches the search criteria, in order to make sure the search algorithm terminates; it is a humorous example of a sentinel value
- Epigrams on Programming, a humorous article by Alan Perlis in 1982.
- Evil bit, a fictional IPv4 packet header field
- Eyeball search, humorous terminology
- FINO (first in, never out) (sometimes seen as "FISH", for first in, still here), a humorous scheduling algorithm, as opposed to traditional first in, first out (FIFO) and last in, first out (LIFO)
- Garbage in, garbage out (GIGO), the concept that flawed, or nonsense input data produces nonsense output
- J. Random Hacker, an arbitrary programmer (hacker)
- Halt and Catch Fire (HCF), an idiom referring to a computer machine code instruction that causes the computer's CPU to cease meaningful operation
- Hex, a fictional computer featured in the Discworld novels by Terry Pratchett
- Hexspeak, like leetspeak, a novelty form of spelling using the hexadecimal digits
- Hyper Text Coffee Pot Control Protocol (HTCPCP), a facetious communication protocol for controlling, monitoring, and diagnosing coffee pots
- Interactive EasyFlow, a diagramming and flow charting software package that included a humorous software licence This is where the bloodthirsty licensing agreement is supposed to go...
- Internet Oracle, an effort at collective humor in a pseudo-Socratic question-and-answer format
- IP over Avian Carriers, a joke proposal to carry IP traffic by birds such as homing pigeons
- It's Geek 2 Me, a tech cartoon
- Jargon File, a glossary and usage dictionary of slang used by computer programmers
- The Joy of Tech, a webcomic
- Kitchen Table International, a fictitious computer company
- Kremvax, originally a fictitious Usenet site at the Kremlin, named like the then large number of Usenet VAXen with names of the form "foovax"
- lp0 on fire (also known as Printer on Fire), is an outdated error message generated on some Unix and Unix-like computer operating systems in response to certain types of printer errors
- Magic smoke (also factory smoke, blue smoke, angry pixies, or the genie), a humorous name for the caustic smoke produced by burning out electronic circuits or components
- Ninety–ninety rule: "the first 90% of the code accounts for the first 90% of the development time. The remaining 10% of the code accounts for the other 90% of the development time"
- Null device, in programmer jargon, the bit bucket or black hole
- PC LOAD LETTER or PC LOAD A4, a printer error message that has entered popular culture as a technology meme referring to a confusing or inappropriate error message
- Slowsort, a humorous, not useful, sorting algorithm
- The Tao of Programming, a 1987 book by Geoffrey James
- TPS report, Testing Procedure Specification, has come to mean pointless, mindless paperwork
- User error, an error made by the human user of a complex system. Related slang terms include PMAC ("problem exists between monitor and chair"), identity error or ID-10T/1D-10T error ("idiot error"), PICNIC ("problem in chair, not in computer"), IBM error ("idiot behind machine error")
- User Friendly, a former daily webcomic
- Working Daze, a comic strip
- Write-only memory (joke)
- xkcd, a webcomic
- Zaltair, a fictional computer created by Steve Wozniak

== See also ==
- Computational humor, a branch of computational linguistics and artificial intelligence which uses computers in humor research
- Humor on the internet
- Mathematical joke
- Geek
- Esoteric programming language
- List of humorous units of measurement
