= Geek humor =

Geek humor may refer to:

- Humor of or about geeks
- Computer humor
- Internet humor
- Mathematical joke
