= Magic string =

Input which activates otherwise hidden functionality

In computer programming, a magic string is an input that a programmer believes will never come externally and which activates otherwise hidden functionality. A user of this program would likely provide input that gives an expected response in most situations. However, if the user does in fact innocently (unintentionally) provide the pre-defined input, invoking the internal functionality, the program response is often quite unexpected to the user (thus appearing "magical").

== Background ==
Typically, the implementation of magic strings is due to time constraints. A developer must find a fast solution instead of delving more deeply into a problem and finding a better solution. For example, when testing a program that takes a user's personal details and verifies their credit card number, a developer may decide to add a magic string shortcut whereby entering the unlikely input of "***" as a credit card number would cause the program to automatically proceed as if the card were valid, without spending time verifying it. If the developer forgets to remove the magic string, and a user of the final program happens to enter "***" as a placeholder credit card number while filling in the form, the user would inadvertently trigger the hidden functionality.

== Resolution ==
=== Situations/issues of cause ===
Often there are significant time constraints out of the developer's control right from the beginning of their involvement in a project. Common issues that might lead to this anti-pattern as a result:

- Null != null or any variation where a data type doesn't compare bitwise to a supposedly identical type. This is an issue that can even occur within the same development environment (same programming language and compiler). This problem has a long history for numerical and boolean types and most compilers handle this well (with applicable warnings and errors, default resolution, etc...). Nullable types such as strings have the difficulty of historically different definitions for NULL. The errors/warnings produced are often general or a 'best fit' default error whose message does not actually describe what's going on. If the developer can't get enough clues to track the issue down through debugging, taking a short cut, and coding in a 'default' string, may be the only way to keep the project on schedule. One solution to this may be the application of the Null Object pattern.
- Programmed into a corner. Sometimes a design seems straightforward and even simple, but turns out to have a logical flaw relating to possible user input due to an often unforeseen circumstance towards the end of planned development. Thus a developer might feel the need to implement a user input with special security/operational allowances to deal with such circumstances. This can be particularly ironic since it will sometimes become obvious that a more robust design from the beginning would likely have left room to handle the flaw. However this would perhaps have taken too much time to implement and it might have conflicted with the fundamental engineering concept of KISS, keeping a design and implementation simple and meeting only the initial necessary requirements.
- Allowing external access to a global flag. Over-confidence that a global flag can never be set accidentally or maliciously (often a quite reasonable assumption) justifies such implementation for testing and debugging purposes, especially for small applications with simple interfaces. If the distribution of the program is considerable however, it is usually just a matter of time before somebody sets the flag. An obvious solution is to never use a global variable in such a manner. A developer might also inadvertently make the flag circumstantially accessible. So the magic string by itself would be dealt with by the program as any other input. The user would then have to reproduce the setting as well as the particular set of circumstances or events that enables the user interface to allow the flag to discretely accept the setting—‌a far more unlikely (though still possible) scenario.

=== Strict formatting ===
Restricting the format of the input is a possible maintenance (bug fixing) solution — essentially this means validating input information to check that it is in the correct format, in order to reduce the possibility of the magic string being discovered by the user. Examples include validating a telephone number to ensure that it contains only digits (and possibly spaces and punctuation to a limited extent) or checking that a person's name has a forename and a surname (and is appropriately capitalised). An exception is made for the magic string in the validation code so that it will not be rejected by validation. It is expected that, since a user would likely quickly notice the strict enforcement of formatting, it would likely not occur to the user to try inputting a string not conforming to the format. Therefore, it is very unlikely for the user to try the magic string.

As with any input validation process, it is important to ensure that the format is not restrictive in a way that unintentionally restricts the use of the application by some users. An example of this is restricting telephone number or postal code input based on one country's system (e.g. requiring every user to give a five-digit ZIP code), causing problems for legitimate users who are based in other countries.

== Purposeful implementation ==
As is often the case with anti-patterns, there exist specific scenarios where magic strings are a correct solution for an implementation. Examples include cheat codes and Easter eggs. Furthermore, there are cases when users invent magic strings, and systems that have not coded to accept them can produce unexpected results such as missing license plates.

== Incidents ==
The following is a list of some known incidents where use of a magic string has caused problems.

- In several different cases, motorists with personalized strings on their vehicle registration plates have received incorrect traffic tickets. In affected ticketing systems, when police officers would fill out a traffic ticket for a car with no registration plate, they would write "NOPLATE", "NOTAG", "MISSING", or similar. This caused issues when motorists were granted actual registration plates with these values, and thus began receiving numerous traffic tickets intended for these plateless vehicles.
- In 1999, hackers revealed a security flaw in Hotmail that permitted anybody to log in to any Hotmail account using the password 'eh'. At the time it was called "the most widespread security incident in the history of the Web".
- People with the last name Null have reported a variety of problems using online systems, such as being unable to book plane tickets, use government tax websites, or pay utility bills. The issue stems from these systems confusing their name for a null pointer. Depending on the system, this may cause the system to not show their name, to ask the user to enter a different name (sometimes with a message claiming that the name field had been left blank), or to show an error message.

== See also ==
- Magic number (programming)
- Time formatting and storage bugs, for problems that can be caused by magics
- Sentinel value (aka flag value, trip value, rogue value, signal value, dummy data)
- Canary value, special value to detect buffer overflows
- Video games cheat codes which have the same origin
- XYZZY (command)
