= Void safety =

Feature of object-oriented programming

Void safety (also known as null safety) is a guarantee within an object-oriented programming language that no object references will have null or void values.

In object-oriented languages, access to objects is achieved through references (or, equivalently, pointers). A typical call is of the form x.f(a, ...), where f denotes an operation and x denotes a reference to some object. At execution time, however, a reference can be void (or null). In such cases, the call above will be a void call, leading to a run-time exception, often resulting in abnormal termination of the program.

Void safety is a static (compile-time) guarantee that a void call will never arise.

== History ==
In a 2009 talk, Tony Hoare traced the invention of the null pointer to his design of the ALGOL W language and called it a "mistake":

I call it my billion-dollar mistake. It was the invention of the null reference in 1965. At that time, I was designing the first comprehensive type system for references in an object oriented language (ALGOL W). My goal was to ensure that all use of references should be absolutely safe, with checking performed automatically by the compiler. But I couldn't resist the temptation to put in a null reference, simply because it was so easy to implement. This has led to innumerable errors, vulnerabilities, and system crashes, which have probably caused a billion dollars of pain and damage in the last forty years.

Bertrand Meyer introduced the term "void safety".

== In programming languages ==
An early attempt to guarantee void safety was the design of the Self programming language.

The Eiffel language is void-safe according to its ISO-ECMA standard; the void-safety mechanism is implemented in EiffelStudio starting with version 6.1 and using a modern syntax starting with version 6.4.

The Spec# language, a research language from Microsoft Research, has a notion of "non-nullable type" addressing void safety. The F# language, a functional-first language from Microsoft Research running on .NET framework, is void-safe except when interoperating with other .NET languages.

=== Null safety based in union types ===
Since 2011 several languages support union types and intersection types, which can be used to detect possible null pointers at compiling time, using a special class Null of which the value null is its unique instance.

The null safety based in types appeared first in Ceylon, followed soon by TypeScript.

The C# language implements compile-time null safety check since version 8. However, to stay compatible with older versions of the language, the feature is opt-in on a per project or per file basis.

The Dart language has implemented it since its version 2.0, in August 2018

Other languages that use null-safe types by default include JetBrains' Kotlin, Rust, and Apple's Swift.

Java's Project Valhalla proposes null-restricted types; for example, String! name; declares that the java.lang.String object cannot ever have the value null, while String? name; is an explicit indication that the java.lang.String object may hold null.

In C++, the "Guidelines Support Library" (not a part of the C++ Standard Library, but a supplementary library for the so-called "C++ Core Guidelines", authored by Bjarne Stroustrup and Herb Sutter but not officially endorsed) provides a gsl::not_null<T> class used for restricting a pointer or smart pointer to only hold non-null values.

== See also ==
- Nullable type
- Option type
- Safe navigation operator
