= Result type =

Concept in functional programming

In functional programming, a result type is a monadic type holding a returned value or an error code. They provide an elegant way of handling errors, without resorting to exception handling; when a function that may fail returns a result type, the programmer is forced to consider success or failure paths, before getting access to the expected result; this eliminates the possibility of an erroneous programmer assumption.

== Examples ==
- In C++, it is defined by the standard library as std::expected<T, E>.
- In Elm, it is defined by the standard library as type Result e v = Ok v | Err e.
- In Haskell, by convention the Either type is used for this purpose, which is defined by the standard library as data Either a b = Left a | Right b, where a is the error type and b is the return type.
- In Java, it is not natively in the standard library, but is available from third party libraries. For example, result4j which includes an interface com.github.sviperll.result4j.Result<R, E> similar to Rust Result<T, E>, and vavr includes an interface io.vavr.control.Either<L, R> similar to Haskell Either a b. Because Java and Kotlin are cross-compatible, Java can use the kotlin.Result<T> type from Kotlin.
- In Kotlin, it is defined by the standard library as kotlin.Result<T>.
- In OCaml, it is defined by the standard library as type ('a, 'b) result = Ok of 'a | Error of 'b type.
- In Python, it is not natively in the standard library, but is available from third party libraries such as returns and result.
- In Rust, it is defined by the standard library as std::result::Result<T, E>, an enum with Ok and Err cases. Additional aliases inside other namespaces exist, such as std::io::Result<T> (which is an alias for std::result::Result<T, std::io::Error>).
- In Scala, the standard library also defines an Either type, however Scala also has more conventional exception handling.
- In Swift, it is defined by the standard library as @frozen enum Result<Success, Failure> where Failure : Error.
- In V, the result type is implemented natively using !T as the return type of a function. For example fn my_function() !string { ... }. Error Handling in V.

=== C++ ===
The std::expected<T, E> class uses std::unexpected() to return the type E, and can return T directly.

import std;

using std::expected;
using std::ifstream;
using std::string;
using std::stringstream;
using std::unexpected;
using std::filesystem::path;

enum class FileError {
    MISSING_FILE,
    NO_PERMISSION,
    // more errors here
};

expected<string, FileError> loadConfig(const path& p) noexcept {
    if (!std::filesystem::exists(p)) {
        return unexpected(FileError::MISSING_FILE);
    }
    ifstream config{p};
    stringstream buffer;
    if (!config.is_open()) {
        return unexpected(FileError::NO_PERMISSION);
    }
    buffer << config.rdbuf();
    config.close();
    return buffer.str();
}

int main(int argc, char* argv[]) {
    path p{"configs/my_config.txt"};
    if (const expected<String, FileError> s = loadConfig(p); s.has_value()) {
        std::println("Config contents: {}", s.value());
    } else {
        switch (s.error) {
            case FileError::MISSING_FILE:
                std::println("Error: path {} not valid or missing!", p);
                break;
            case FileError::NO_PERMISSION:
                std::println("Error: no permission to read file at path {}!", p);
                break;
            // additional cases...
            default:
                std::unreachable();
        }
    }
}

A tag std::unexpect (of type std::unexpect_t) may be used to directly construct an error state inside a std::expected. A specialization for std::expected<void, E> exists for when a function does not return any data upon success. If the value() method is called on a std::expected that contains an error, a std::bad_expected_access exception is thrown.

=== Rust ===
Enums in Rust are tagged unions, which can be unpacked with strong type checking through pattern matching. The Rust expected type is std::result::Result<T, E>, with additional aliases across the standard library.

const CAT_FOUND: bool = true;

fn main() {
    let result: Result<(), String> = pet_cat();
    match result {
        Ok(_) => println!("Great, we could pet the cat!"),
        Err(error) => println!("Oh no, we couldn't pet the cat: {error}")
    }
}

fn pet_cat() -> Result<(), String> {
    if CAT_FOUND {
        Ok(())
    } else {
        Err(String::from("The cat is nowhere to be found!"))
    }
}

=== Vlang ===
The Error type is an interface for iError.

const cat_found = true

fn main() {
    cat_name := get_pet_cat_name() or { 
        println("Oh no, we couldn't pet the cat!")
        exit(1)
    }

    println('Great, we could pet the cat ' + cat_name)
}

fn get_pet_cat_name() !string {
    if cat_found { return 'Max' } 
    else { return error('the cat is nowhere to be found') }
}

== See also ==
- Option type
- Exception handling
- Tagged union
- Return type
