= Magic word (disambiguation) =

Magic words are often nonsense phrases used in fantasy fiction or by stage magicians.

Magic word or Magic words may also refer to:

== Computing ==
- In MediaWiki, a system that makes system information, such as the current time, available to templates and editors
- Hexspeak, hexadecimal "words" used in byte code to identify a specific file or data format are known as magic numbers
- Magic string, an input that a programmer believes will never come externally and which activates otherwise hidden functionality
- Xyzzy (computing), the first magic word encountered in Colossal Cave Adventure and often used as a meta-syntactic variable

== Television ==
- "Magic Words", an episode of the TV series Pocoyo

== Other uses ==
- Kotodama, the Japanese belief that mystical powers dwell in words and names, sometimes translated as "magic words" in English
- Magical formula, words or formulae used in ceremonial magic
- Magic words (baseball), words that will likely see a player ejected from the game if directed at an umpire
- Magic words (politics), words or phrases as illustrative of speech that qualified as "express advocacy" in relation to United States politics
- "Please" and "thank you", often referred to as the magic word or magic words when teaching children manners, see Etiquette

== See also ==
- Alan Moore's Magic Words, comics adaptations of four songs by Alan Moore
- Incantation, a magical formula intended to trigger a magical effect on a person or objects
- Mantra, a sacred word, words or syllables in Sanskrit, Pali and other languages
