= Binsted (surname) =

Binsted is a surname. Notable people with the surname include:

- Kim Binsted, American computer scientist
- Norman S. Binsted (1890–1961), American Episcopalian missionary bishop

== See also ==
- Binsted
- Binsted, West Sussex
- Jack Binstead (born 1996), English actor, comedian, and retired athlete
