= Shinshu University of International =

Fictional Japanese university located in Nagano prefecture

- First appearance: 5channel thread

In-universe information
- Type: Humorous internet meme
- Location: Azumino, Nagano Prefecture, Japan
- Motto: 為せば成る、為さなくてもなるようにはなる (Where there is a will, there is a way. Where there is no will, there is still a way.）
- University type: Private

Shinshu University of International (国際信州学院大学, Kokusai Shinshū Gakuin daigaku) is a hoax about a fake university made up by users of 5channel, claimed to be located in Azumino, Nagano Prefecture, Japan. The nonexistent university has spread through social networks, and later gained attention on multiple medias.

In May 2018, a Twitter account claiming to be an official account of a nonexistent restaurant complained that the reservation for 50 workers in the university was suddenly cancelled, calling for an action, which tricked many users on the platform.

== Origin ==
The hoax was initially started in a 5channel thread "受験シーズンだし安価で架空の大学を作って受験生釣ろうぜ" (It's the exam season so let's make a fake university to trick the students) on January 27, 2018. The creators of the hoax later set up an official website for the university, along with several fictional clubs and official accounts being created across the internet.

== Viral spread ==
The hoax was spread across the internet on various social medias, as the 5channel users invented random facts about the fictional university. Over 20 accounts claiming to be an official club of the university, or anything associated with the hoax emerged across the internet.

The hoax were spread further when in May an account claiming to be a nonexistent udon restaurant complained on Twitter that the reservation for 50 workers in the university was suddenly cancelled causing the post to come under fire by tricked users believing the hoax.
