= Discriminated union =

The term discriminated union may refer to:

- Disjoint union in set theory
- Tagged union in computer science
