= Sentinel value =

In-band data value that must be handled specially by computer code

In computer programming, a sentinel value (also referred to as a flag value, trip value, rogue value, signal value, or dummy data) is a special value in the context of an algorithm which uses its presence as a condition of termination, typically in a loop or recursive algorithm.

The sentinel value is a form of in-band data that makes it possible to detect the end of the data when no out-of-band data (such as an explicit size indication) is provided. The value should be selected in such a way that it is guaranteed to be distinct from all legal data values since otherwise, the presence of such values would prematurely signal the end of the data (the semipredicate problem). In safe languages, most sentinel values could be replaced with option types, which enforce explicit handling of the exceptional case.

Sometimes, it may make more sense to return a null pointer or null value, or when working with option types, return the none/null option.

== Examples ==
Some examples of common sentinel values and their uses:

- Null character for indicating the end of a null-terminated string.
- Null pointer for indicating the end of a linked list or a tree.
- A set most significant bit in a stream of equally spaced data values, for example, a set 8th bit in a stream of 7-bit ASCII characters stored in 8-bit bytes indicating a special property (like inverse video, boldface or italics) or the end of the stream.
- A negative integer for indicating the end of a sequence of non-negative integers.

== Variants ==
A related practice, used in slightly different circumstances, is to place some specific value at the end of the data, in order to avoid the need for an explicit test for termination in some processing loop, because the value will trigger termination by the tests already present for other reasons. Unlike the above uses, this is not how the data is naturally stored or processed, but is instead an optimization, compared to the straightforward algorithm that has two tests for termination. This is typically used in searching.

For instance, when searching for a particular value in an unsorted list, every element will be compared against this value, with the loop terminating when equality is found; however, to deal with the case that the value should be absent, one must also test after each step for having completed the search unsuccessfully. By appending the value searched for to the end of the list, an unsuccessful search is no longer possible, and no explicit termination test is required in the inner loop. After the search, one must decide whether a true match was found, but this test needs to be performed only once rather than at each iteration. Knuth calls the value so placed at the end of the data, a dummy value rather than a sentinel.

The same technique can be used in sorting. Many sorting algorithms (insertion sort and quicksort in particular) have an inner loop which consists of searching linearly for a mispositioned element. By placing a known item out of position at the end of the array, the inner loop does not need a separate check for the end of the array.

This was used in a joke about searching for an elephant in Africa. Starting at the southern tip of Africa, a searcher could avoid needing to check for Africa's northern border by placing "a known elephant in Cairo" to ensure an elephant will be found first.

=== Examples ===
==== Array ====
For example, if searching for a value in an array in C, a straightforward implementation is as follows; note the use of a negative number (invalid index) to solve the semipredicate problem of returning "no result":

int find(int arr[], size_t len, int val) {
    for (int i = 0; i < len; i++) {
        if (arr[i] == val) {
            return i;
        }
    }
    return -1; // not found
}

However, this does two tests at each iteration of the loop: whether the value has been found and whether the end of the array has been reached. This latter test is what is avoided by using a sentinel value. Assuming the array can be extended by one element (without memory allocation or cleanup; this is more realistic for a linked list, as below), this can be rewritten as:

int find(int arr[], size_t len, int val) {  // requires arr has space for len+1 entries
    int i = 0;
    arr[len] = val; // add sentinel value
    while (arr[i] != val) {
        ++i;
    }
    return i < len ? i : -1;
}

The test for i < len is still present, but it has been moved outside the loop, which now contains only a single test (for the value), and is guaranteed to terminate due to the sentinel value. There is a single check on termination if the sentinel value has been hit, which replaces a test for each iteration.

It is also possible to temporarily replace the last element of the array by a sentinel and handle it, especially if it is reached:

int find(int arr[], size_t len, int val) {
    if (len == 0) {
        return -1;
    }
    int last = arr[len - 1];
    arr[len - 1] = val; // add sentinel value

    int i = 0;
    while (arr[i] != val) {
        ++i;
    }
    arr[len - 1] = last;
    return arr[i] == val ? i : -1;
}

=== Null values ===
This is an example of returning null pointers and null options.

import std;

using std::nullopt;
using std::optional;
using std::string;
using std::string_view;
using std::vector;

struct User {
private:
    string name;
public:
    explicit User(string_view name):
        name{name} {}

    void setName(string_view s) noexcept {
        name = s;
    }

    [[nodiscard]]
    string getName() const noexcept {
        return name;
    }
};

[[nodiscard]]
User* findUserByName(vector<User>& users, string_view name) noexcept {
    for (size_t i = 0; i < users.size(); ++i) {
        if (users[i].getName() == name) {
            return &users[i];
        }
    }
    return nullptr; // Sentinel value: not found
}

[[nodiscard]]
optional<int> findIndex(string_view name, const vector<User>& users) noexcept {
    for (size_t i = 0; i < users.size(); ++i) {
        if (users[i].getName() == name) {
            return i;
        }
    }
    return nullopt; // Sentinel value: not found
}

== See also ==
- Canary value
- Semipredicate problem
- Elephant in Cairo
- Magic number (programming)
- Magic string
- Null object pattern
- Time formatting and storage bugs
