= World's funniest joke =

Result of a massive psychology experiment by Richard Wiseman

The "world's funniest joke" is a term used by Richard Wiseman of the University of Hertfordshire in 2002 to summarize one of the results of his research. For his experiment, named LaughLab, he created a website where people could rate and submit jokes. Purposes of the research included discovering the joke that had the widest appeal and understanding among different cultures, demographics and countries.

The History Channel eventually hosted a special on the subject.

== Winning joke ==
The winning joke, which was later found to be based on a 1951 Goon Show sketch by Spike Milligan, was submitted by Gurpal Gosal of Manchester:

Two hunters are out in the woods when one of them collapses. He doesn't seem to be breathing and his eyes are glazed. The other guy whips out his phone and calls the emergency services. He gasps, "My friend is dead! What can I do?" The operator says, "Calm down. I can help. First, let's make sure he's dead." There is a silence; then a gun shot is heard. Back on the phone, the guy says, "OK, now what?"

== Other findings ==
Researchers also included five computer-generated jokes, four of which fared rather poorly, but one was rated higher than one third of the human jokes:

What kind of murderer has moral fiber? A cereal killer.

The joke that was submitted to LaughLab the most times was:

What's brown and sticky? A stick.

During a Science Vs podcast episode, Richard Wiseman said this about whether it's actually the world's funniest joke:

It was the joke that most people didn't hate. It's so you can look at any one group. You can look at men or women or young or old or Canadians. And there's always a joke that they thought was much, much funnier. But when you pulled the data, you got the average. And that's the average. It's the average joke.
