= Null object pattern =

Object with no referenced value or with defined neutral ("null") behavior

In object-oriented computer programming, a null object is an object with no referenced value or with defined neutral (null) behavior. The null object design pattern, which describes the uses of such objects and their behavior (or lack thereof), was first published as "Void Value" and later in the Pattern Languages of Program Design book series as "Null Object".

== Description ==
Instead of using a null reference to represent the absence of an object, a null object implements the expected interface but performs no action. This avoids the need for conditional checks scattered throughout calling code, since the null object can be used interchangeably with a real one.

For example, code that retrieves a list of files from a folder might otherwise need to check for a null reference or handle a thrown exception when the folder is empty. Returning an empty list instead — a null object — lets the calling code iterate over the result exactly as it would for a non-empty list, with no special-case handling required.

The caller can still explicitly check whether the list is empty if that distinction matters for its logic.

The pattern is also useful for providing stand-in implementations during testing, such as substituting for a database connection that isn't available in a test environment.

== Relation to other patterns ==
It can be regarded as a special case of the State pattern and the Strategy pattern.

It is not a pattern from Design Patterns, but is mentioned in Martin Fowler's Refactoring and Joshua Kerievsky's Refactoring To Patterns as the Insert Null Object refactoring.

Chapter 17 of Robert Cecil Martin's Agile Software Development: Principles, Patterns and Practices is dedicated to the pattern.

== In various languages ==
=== C++ ===
A language with statically typed references to objects illustrates how the null object becomes a more complicated pattern:

import std;

using std::unique_ptr;

class Animal {
public:
    virtual ~Animal() = default;

    virtual void makeSound() const = 0;
};

class Dog: public Animal {
public:
    virtual void makeSound() const override { 
        std::println("Woof!"); 
    }
};

class NullAnimal: public Animal {
public:
    virtual void makeSound() const override {
        // silence...
    }
};

int main() {
    unique_ptr<Animal> dog = std::make_unique<Dog>();
    dog->makeSound(); // outputs "Woof!"

    unique_ptr<Animal> unknown = std::make_unique<NullAnimal>();
    unknown->makeSound(); // outputs nothing, but does not throw a runtime exception
}

Here, the idea is that there are situations where a pointer or reference to an Animal object is required, but there is no appropriate object available. A null reference is impossible in standard-conforming C++. A null Animal* pointer is possible, and could be useful as a place-holder, but may not be used for direct dispatch: a->makeSound() is undefined behavior if a is a null pointer.

The null object pattern solves this problem by providing a special NullAnimal class which can be instantiated bound to an Animal pointer or reference.

The special null class must be created for each class hierarchy that is to have a null object, since a NullAnimal is of no use when what is needed is a null object with regard to some Widget base class that is not related to the Animal hierarchy.

Note that NOT having a null class at all is an important feature, in contrast to languages where "anything is a reference" (e.g., Java and C#). In C++, the design of a function or method may explicitly state whether null is allowed or not.

// Function which requires an Animal instance, and will not accept null.
void doSomething(const Animal& animal) {
    // animal may never be null here.
}

// Function which may accept an Animal instance or null.
void doSomething(const Animal* animal) {
    // animal may be null.
}

=== C# ===
C# is a language in which the null object pattern can be properly implemented. This example shows animal objects that display sounds and a NullAnimal instance used in place of the C# null keyword. The null object provides consistent behaviour and prevents a runtime null reference exception that would occur if the C# null keyword were used instead.

namespace Wikipedia.Examples;

// Null object pattern implementation:
using System;

// Animal interface is the key to compatibility for Animal implementations below.
interface IAnimal
{
	void MakeSound();
}

// Animal is the base case.
abstract class Animal : IAnimal
{
	// A shared instance that can be used for comparisons
	public static readonly IAnimal Null = new NullAnimal();
	
	// The Null Case: this NullAnimal class should be used in place of C# null keyword.
	private class NullAnimal : Animal
	{
		public override void MakeSound()
		{
			// Purposefully provides no behaviour.
		}
	}
	public abstract void MakeSound();
}

// Dog is a real animal.
class Dog : Animal
{
	public override void MakeSound()
	{
		Console.WriteLine("Woof!");
	}
}

/* =========================
 * Simplistic usage example in a Main entry point.
 */
static class Program
{
	static void Main()
	{
		IAnimal dog = new Dog();
		dog.MakeSound(); // outputs "Woof!"

		/* Instead of using C# null, use the Animal.Null instance.
         * This example is simplistic but conveys the idea that if the Animal.Null instance is used then the program
         * will never experience a .NET System.NullReferenceException at runtime, unlike if C# null were used.
         */
		IAnimal unknown = Animal.Null;  //<< replaces: IAnimal unknown = null;
		unknown.MakeSound(); // outputs nothing, but does not throw a runtime exception        
	}
}

=== Common Lisp / CLOS ===
In Lisp, functions can gracefully accept the special object nil, which reduces the amount of special case testing in application code. For instance, although nil is an atom and does not have any fields, the functions car and cdr accept nil and just return it, which is very useful and results in shorter code.

Since nil is the empty list in Lisp, the situation described in the introduction above doesn't exist. Code which returns nil is returning what is in fact the empty list (and not anything resembling a null reference to a list type), so the caller does not need to test the value to see whether or not it has a list.

The null object pattern is also supported in multiple value processing. If the program attempts to extract a value from an expression which returns no values, the behavior is that the null object nil is substituted. Thus (list (values)) returns (nil) (a one-element list containing nil). The (values) expression returns no values at all, but since the function call to list needs to reduce its argument expression to a value, the null object is automatically substituted.

This does not apply to Lisp dialect Smalltalk which has a `nil` value distinct from the empty list and false.

==== Usage ====
In Common Lisp, the object nil is the one and only instance of the special class null. What this means is that a method can be specialized to the null class, thereby implementing the null design pattern. Which is to say, it is essentially built into the object system:

;; empty dog class

(defclass dog () ())

;; a dog object makes a sound by barking: woof! is printed on standard output
;; when (make-sound x) is called, if x is an instance of the dog class.

(defmethod make-sound ((obj dog))
  (format t "woof!~%"))

;; allow (make-sound nil) to work via specialization to null class.
;; innocuous empty body: nil makes no sound.
(defmethod make-sound ((obj null)))

The class null is a subclass of the symbol class, because nil is a symbol. Since nil also represents the empty list, null is a subclass of the list class, too. Methods parameters specialized to symbol or list will thus take a nil argument. Of course, a null specialization can still be defined which is a more specific match for nil.

=== Scheme ===
Unlike Common Lisp, and many dialects of Lisp, the Scheme dialect does not have a nil value which works this way; the functions car and cdr may not be applied to an empty list; Scheme application code therefore has to use the empty? or pair? predicate functions to sidestep this situation, even in situations where very similar Lisp would not need to distinguish the empty and non-empty cases thanks to the behavior of nil.

=== Ruby ===
In duck-typed languages like Ruby, language inheritance is not necessary to provide expected behavior.

class Dog
  def sound
    "bark"
  end
end
 
class NilAnimal
  def sound(*); end
end

def get_animal(animal=NilAnimal.new)
  animal
end

get_animal(Dog.new).sound
 => "bark"
get_animal.sound
 => nil

Attempts to directly monkey-patch NilClass instead of providing explicit implementations give more unexpected side effects than benefits.

=== JavaScript ===
In duck-typed languages like JavaScript, language inheritance is not necessary to provide expected behavior.

class Dog {
  sound() {
    return 'bark';
  }
}

class NullAnimal {
  sound() {
    return null;
  }
}

function getAnimal(type) {
  return type === 'dog' ? new Dog() : new NullAnimal();
}

['dog', null].map((animal) => getAnimal(animal).sound());
// Returns ["bark", null]

=== Java ===
package org.wikipedia.examples;

interface Animal {
	void makeSound();
}

class Dog implements Animal {
	public void makeSound() {
		System.out.println("Woof!");
	}
}

class NullAnimal implements Animal {
	public void makeSound() {
        // silence...
	}
}

public class Example {
    public static void main(String[] args) {
        Animal dog = new Dog();
        dog.makeSound(); // outputs "Woof!"

        Animal unknown = new NullAnimal();
        unknown.makeSound(); // outputs nothing, but does not throw a runtime exception
    }
}

This code illustrates a variation of the C++ example, above, using the Java language. As with C++, a null class can be instantiated in situations where a reference to an Animal object is required, but there is no appropriate object available. A null Animal object is possible (Animal myAnimal = null;) and could be useful as a place-holder, but may not be used for calling a method. In this example, myAnimal.makeSound(); will throw a NullPointerException. Therefore, additional code may be necessary to test for null objects.

The null object pattern solves this problem by providing a special NullAnimal class which can be instantiated as an object of type Animal. As with C++ and related languages, that special null class must be created for each class hierarchy that needs a null object, since a NullAnimal is of no use when what is needed is a null object that does not implement the Animal interface.

=== PHP ===
interface Animal
{
    public function makeSound();
}

class Dog implements Animal
{
    public function makeSound()
    {
        echo "Woof...\n";
    }
}

class Cat implements Animal
{
    public function makeSound()
    {
        echo "Meowww...\n";
    }
}

class NullAnimal implements Animal
{
    public function makeSound()
    {
        // silence...
    }
}

$animalType = 'elephant';

function makeAnimalFromAnimalType(string $animalType): Animal
{
    switch ($animalType) {
        case 'dog':
            return new Dog();
        case 'cat':
            return new Cat();
        default:
            return new NullAnimal();
    }
}

makeAnimalFromAnimalType($animalType)->makeSound(); // ..the null animal makes no sound

function animalMakeSound(Animal $animal): void
{
    $animal->makeSound();
}

foreach ([
             makeAnimalFromAnimalType('dog'),
             makeAnimalFromAnimalType('NullAnimal'),
             makeAnimalFromAnimalType('cat'),
         ] as $animal) {
    // That's also reduce null handling code
    animalMakeSound($animal);
}

=== Visual Basic .NET ===
The following null object pattern implementation demonstrates the concrete class providing its corresponding null object in a static field Empty. This approach is frequently used in the .NET Framework (String.Empty, EventArgs.Empty, Guid.Empty, etc.).

Public Class Animal
    Public Shared ReadOnly Empty As Animal = New AnimalEmpty()

    Public Overridable Sub MakeSound()
        Console.WriteLine("Woof!")
    End Sub
End Class

Friend NotInheritable Class AnimalEmpty
    Inherits Animal

    Public Overrides Sub MakeSound()
        ' 
    End Sub
End Class

== Criticism ==
This pattern should be used carefully, as it can make errors/bugs appear as normal program execution.

Care should be taken not to implement this pattern just to avoid null checks and make code more readable, since the harder-to-read code may just move to another place and be less standard—such as when different logic must execute in case the object provided is indeed the null object. The common pattern in most languages with reference types is to compare a reference to a single value referred to as null or nil. Also, there is an additional need for testing that no code anywhere ever assigns null instead of the null object, because in most cases and languages with static typing, this is not a compiler error if the null object is of a reference type, although it would certainly lead to errors at run time in parts of the code where the pattern was used to avoid null checks. On top of that, in most languages and assuming there can be many null objects (i.e., the null object is a reference type but doesn't implement the singleton pattern in one or another way), checking for the null object instead of for the null or nil value introduces overhead, as does the singleton pattern likely itself upon obtaining the singleton reference.

== See also ==
- Nullable type
- Option type
