= Kim Binsted =

American computer scientist

- Born: New Jersey, US
- Title: Professor

Academic background
- Education: McGill University
- Alma mater: University of Edinburgh

Academic work
- Discipline: Computer science
- Sub-discipline: Artificial Intelligence
- Institutions: University of Hawaii
- Main interests: Human-computer interfaces, Long-duration human space exploration
- Notable works: HI-SEAS

Kim Binsted (born in New Jersey, US) is a professor in the Information and Computer Sciences Department at the University of Hawaiʻi at Mānoa. Binsted's work explores artificial intelligence, human-computer interfaces, and long-duration human space exploration.

== Biography ==
Binsted completed her B.Sc. in Physics at McGill University in 1991. During her time at McGill she was a founding member of Montreal's On The Spot improv comedy troupe.

Her Ph.D. in Artificial Intelligence was received from the University of Edinburgh in 1996. Much of her work has been focused on computational models of humor, as well as the use of machine learning in order to generate puns. During her time at the University of Edinburgh she performed in what is now the Edinburgh Fringe's longest running improvised comedy troupe, The Improverts.

Between 1997 and 1999, Binsted worked as an Associate Researcher at Sony's Computer Science Laboratories in Tokyo on human-computer interfaces.

During the summer of 2003 and 2004 Binsted was a NASA Summer Faculty Fellow at Ames Research Center in the Neuroengineering Lab where she worked on sub-vocal speech recognition technology. She held the post of Chief Scientist on the FMARS 2007 Long Duration Mission, which entailed a four-month Mars exploration analogue on Devon Island in the Canadian High Arctic. On sabbatical during 2009 Binsted visited scientists at the Canadian Space Agency (CSA) to work on the CSA's planetary analogues program. From 2002 to 2014 she was a team member at the UH-NASA Astrobiology Institute.

In 2009, she became a visiting scientist to the Canadian Space Agency (CSA) and participated in its planetary analogues program.

In 2017, she progressed to the last 72 among the 3,772 people who had applied to become a Canadian astronaut. She was not one of the two candidates eventually chosen.

Binsted is the principal investigator on HI-SEAS (Hawaii Space Exploration Analog and Simulation).
