= Nullable type =

Feature of some programming languages

Nullable types are a feature of some programming languages which allow a value to be set to the null value instead of the usual possible values of the data type. In statically typed languages, a nullable type is an option type, while in dynamically typed languages (where values have types, but variables do not), equivalent behavior is provided by having a single null value.

The null value is frequently used to represent a missing value or invalid value, such as from a function that failed to return or a missing field in a database, as in NULL in SQL. In other words, the null value is undefined.

Primitive types such as integers and Booleans cannot generally be null, but the corresponding nullable types (nullable integer and nullable Boolean, respectively) can also assume the null value. This can be represented in ternary logic as false, null, true as in three-valued logic.

In languages with nullable types, a nullable type is usually contrasted with a non-nullable type, or a "null-safe type".

== Example ==
An integer variable may represent integers, but 0 (zero) is a special case because 0 in many programming languages can mean "false". Also, this does not provide any notion of saying that the variable is empty, a need that arises in many circumstances. This need can be achieved with a nullable type. In programming languages like C# 2.0, a nullable integer, for example, can be declared by a question mark (int? x).

A Boolean variable makes the effect more clear. Its values can be either "true" or "false", while a nullable Boolean may also contain a representation for "undecided". However, the interpretation or treatment of a logical operation involving such a variable depends on the language.

The following is an example of T? (or explicitly System.Nullable<T>) in C#.

using System;

public class Example
{
    static void Main(string[] args)
    {
        // Using shorthand
        int? a = 10;
        double? b = null;

        // Using explicit Nullable<T>
        Nullable<int> c = 20;
        Nullable<double> d = 5.5;

        // Checking if the nullable variables have values
        Console.WriteLine(a.HasValue); // True
        Console.WriteLine(b.HasValue); // False
        Console.WriteLine(c.HasValue); // True
        Console.WriteLine(d.HasValue); // True

        // Accessing the values
        if (a.HasValue)
        {
            Console.WriteLine(a.Value); // 10
        }

        if (b.HasValue)
        {
            Console.WriteLine(b.Value); // (won't be executed because b is null)
        }
    }
}

== Compared with null pointers ==
In contrast, object pointers can be set to null by default in most common languages, meaning that the pointer or reference points to nowhere, that no object is assigned (the variable does not point to any object). Nullable references were invented by C. A. R. Hoare in 1965 as part of the Algol W language. Hoare later described his invention as a "billion-dollar mistake". This is because object pointers that can be null require the user to check the pointer before using it and require specific code to handle the case when the object pointer is null.

Java has classes that correspond to scalar values, such as java.lang.Integer, java.lang.Boolean, and java.lang.Float. Combined with autoboxing (automatic usage-driven conversion between object and value), this effectively allows nullable variables for scalar values.

== Compared with option types ==
Nullable type implementations usually adhere to the null object pattern.

There is a more general and formal concept that extend the nullable type concept: it comes from option types, which enforce explicit handling of the exceptional case.

== Language support ==
The following programming languages support nullable types.

Statically typed languages with native null support include:

- Ballerina
- C and C++
- C#
- Dart
- Kotlin
- Ceylon
- SQL
- SAS (Missing values)

Statically typed languages with library null support include:

- C# (since version 2)
- Delphi
- Free Pascal
- VB.NET
- Java (since version 8)
- Scala
- Oxygene
- F#
- Statically typed CLI languages

Dynamically-typed languages with null include:

- JavaScript has a null and undefined values.
- Julia has the nothing value (which is of type Nothing) and the Union{T, Nothing} type idiom.
- Perl scalar variables default to undef and can be set to undef.
- PHP with NULL type and is_null() method, native nullable type in version 7.1
- Python has the None value.
- Ruby has the nil value and NilClass type.

== See also ==
- Null coalescing operator
- Semipredicate problem
- Union type
- Unit type
- Void safety
