= Humor on the Internet =

The history of humor on the Internet begins together with the Internet itself. Initially, some used the Internet and its precursors, LANs and WANs, as another medium to disseminate jokes and other kinds of humor, in addition to the traditional ones ("word of mouth", printed media, sound recording, radio, film, and TV). In lockstep with the progress of electronic communication technologies, jokes were posted to the ARPANET, e-mail, Usenet newsgroups (e.g., rec.humor and alt.humor), bulletin board systems, etc., and finally the whole World Wide Web. Gradually, new forms of humor evolved, based on the new possibilities delivered by electronic means of communication. Popular forms of Internet humor are found in the form of memes, GIFs, and short form videos. Reaction videos, where amusement is expressed through a person's response to something, are another prevalent form of humor unique to the Internet.

== Impact on humor ==
The Internet made an impact on humor in several important ways.

Similarly to other technical innovations (from printing to TV), Internet significantly increased the speed and the extent of the propagation of humor over the world. The joke is a commonly transmitted type of Internet meme. It is well known that orally-transmitted jokes and other kind of folklore undergo evolution and mutations. Internet speeds up and globalizes these processes.

A FAQ of rec.humor gave the following tongue-in-cheek description how jokes propagated in the era of newsgroups:

1. Somebody makes up the joke.
2. The joke spreads to about 50 people.
3. Somebody posts it to rec.humor.
4. Ten thousand people read the joke on rec.humor.
5. Eight hundred of these people repeat the joke to somebody.
6. Twenty of those people are clueless enough to repost the joke to rec.humor, apparently lacking either the reading skills to have seen it the first time, the basic pattern-recognition capability to identify it in its last ten repetitions, or the short-term memory to realize that it's the same joke again.
7. Loop back to step 4, about ten times.
8. Repeat from step 3 about every two months.

On the opposite side, unlike previous technical means, the Internet as a whole eliminates censorship and self-censorship of humor. For example, before the Internet, black comedy, such as dead baby jokes, was almost exclusively spread orally.

The Internet blurred the lines between written and spoken in terms of language use and the directness of speech, between what is permitted in private and in public. Also, YouTube blurred the distinction between a spoken and recorded joke, in that the narrator is actually present.

Limor and Lemish observe that Internet humor is a part of the participatory culture, where the consumers of jokes may reciprocate by generating and transmitting humor, i.e., act as producers and distributors.

== New types of humor ==
New possibilities provided by electronic means of communication gave rise to new types of humor. An early example of these is humorous ASCII art. While the precursor of the ASCII art, the "typewriter art", has been known since 19th century, it was available to few. Whereas ASCII art, including silly one, has become ubiquitous in sig blocks in discussion boards and e-mails. One may find quite a few silly examples in the Jargon File, which also mentions subgenres of ASCII art humor: puns on the letter/character names (e.g., if read "B" as "bee" and the caret character (^) as "carrot", the one may create an ASCII art rebus for a "bee in a carrot patch") and pictures of "silly cows".

The ability to easily manipulate with images and videos combined with ease of the dissemination of them via the Internet introduced new forms of graphical humor, such as lolcats, demotivators, and funny animations.

== Mediums of humor on the Internet ==
Different mediums such as GIFS, Memes, and short-form videos have been used to convey humor on the Internet.

=== GIFs ===
The Graphics Interchange Format, commonly known as GIF, was created by Steve Wilhite in 1987 and has since become a popular vehicle for humorous expression on the Internet. Characterized by their concise and looping animations, GIFs facilitate rapid and universal communications of humor, making them a tool for online exchanges across social media, messaging platforms, and online forums.

A core aspect of GIFs' effectiveness lies in their references to popular media (films, news, memes, social media platforms, animations, viral videos) or past events. By incorporating these references, GIFs provide a shortcut for viewers to communicate, understand and connect with the humor, fostering a shared understanding of the joke. Their repetitive nature, continuously looping, further intensifies their humorous effect by allowing the sender and viewer to expect and savor the comic effect.

Additionally, GIFs frequently include overlaid text or captions to provide context, deliver punchlines, and boost the overall relatability of the digital medium. The layering structure assists viewers in understanding the message, thereby amplifying its impact and enhancing the humor, making it more relevant, and engaging.

Finally, the non-verbal, visual nature of GIFs allows them to transcend language and cultural barriers, enabling users to express complex reactions, like surprise, excitement, sarcasm, anger, disbelief, or amusement, and be understood by a worldwide audience. This widespread adoption of GIFs has cemented them as a fundamental instrument for online humor and communication. Users frequently use GIFS as responses, replacing textual communication with easily understood visual reactions, underscoring the modern preference for concise and immediate communication in online interactions.

Therefore, GIFs have become an indispensable component of online humor, attributed to their relatable content, integration within mainstream media culture, effective repetitions, ability to combine text and visuals, and universal accessibility.

=== Memes ===
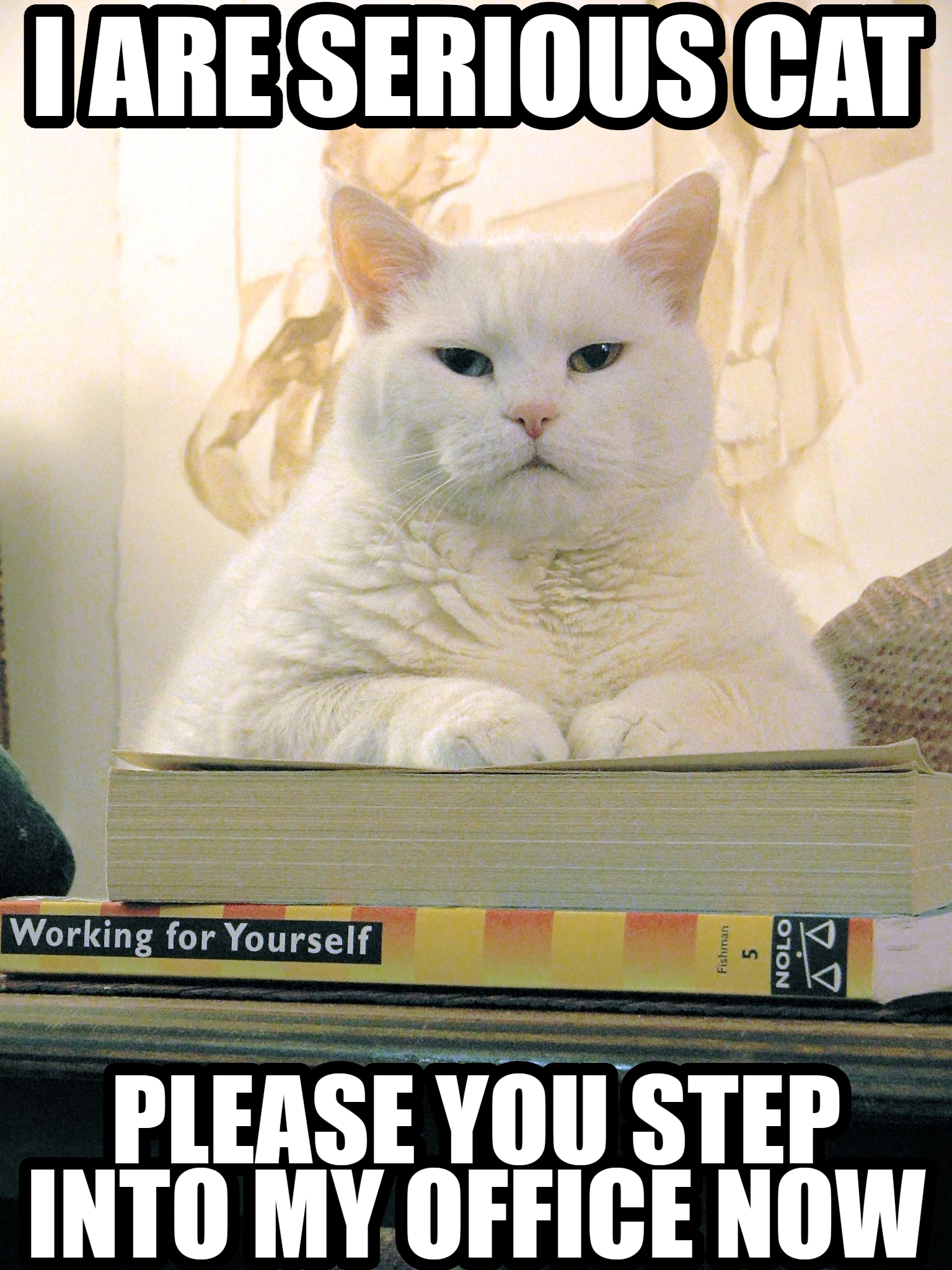
A lolcat image macro, a meme style especially popular in the mid-and-late 2000s

Memes are another medium through which humor on the Internet is propagated. The term meme originally was coined by Dawkins in 1976 referring to the viral spread of ideas. Now the Internet meme is used to communicate humor on the Internet though jokes, images, videos. Memes are typically images, with text superimposed over them, which together create a humorous effect.

Memes are associated with the second iteration of the Internet, when users began participating in online content creation. For many media scholars, memes represent the shift from passive online consumption to active participation.

Creators of memes will often use humor styles such as sarcasm and silliness to communicate digitally across different online platforms and while they can be niche and very culturally specific, they are often widely shared and may go viral across the Internet.

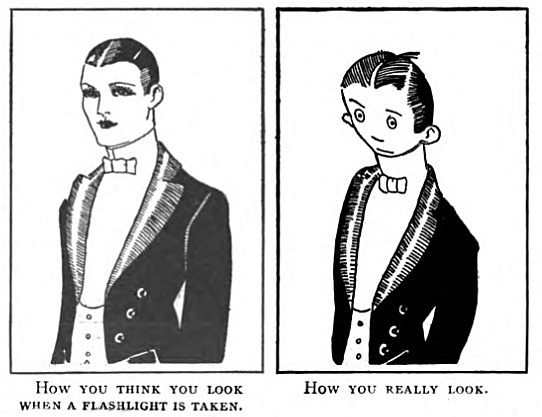
First ever meme from 1921.

Memes are a cultural phenomenon, and harness "key logics" of online life: replicability, sociability, and participation. Media scholars argue that this allows memes to unite people through shared interests and humor, creating communities.

Humorous memes often appear in political contexts, being implicated in contexts like the 2016 American election and Russian politics. Shared humor, in meme format, often elicits political discussion and participation.

Overall memes provide a versatile medium for humor that encourages the participation of individuals in the creation and reproduction of humor on the Internet.

=== Short-Form Videos ===
Short-form videos, typically under three minutes, are a popular digital format for storytelling, entertainment, and sharing information. Designed for humorous consumption, they cater to shorter attention spans and thrive on platforms like TikTok, YouTube Shorts, and Instagram Reels. Creators use humor and authentic self-expression to connect with audiences by acting, singing, and dancing, driving engagement through likes and comments.

This medium is often fast-paced, created by a diverse mix of comedians, influencers, and content creators skilled in audio-visual editing. Its personalized content aligns closely with users' comedic preferences and interests. Humorous short-form videos offer immediate stress relief, and their easy access on social media makes them a popular and effective coping strategy. These videos have been found to reduce anxiety and enhance positive emotions in viewers, further reinforcing their role as a valuable stress-relief tool.

Additionally, humor in short-form videos have been effective in promoting preventive health behaviors, such as those related to infectious diseases, alcohol and tobacco by capturing attention and improving content recognition. During the COVID-19 pandemic, humorous social distancing videos gained popularity on social media. These amusing, yet informative videos not only enhance a content creator's appeal but also help spread health information to a wider audience. Furthermore, they have been shown to increase engagement, reduce defensive reactions, and improve the effectiveness of health messages.

Overall, short-form videos that incorporate humor evoke positive emotions, such as happiness and stress relief, motivating individuals to engage with the content more frequently. The growth of social media has expanded the reach of entertaining content, prompting marketers to explore humor's role in video creation.

== See also ==
- Internet phenomenon
- Faxlore
- Computer-Mediated Communication
