= Option type =

Encapsulation of an optional value in programming or type theory

In programming languages (especially functional programming languages) and type theory, an option type or maybe type is a polymorphic type that represents encapsulation of an optional value; e.g., it is used as the return type of functions which may or may not return a meaningful value when they are applied. It consists of a constructor which either is empty (often named None or Nothing), or which encapsulates the original data type A (often written Just A or Some A).

A distinct, but related concept outside of functional programming, which is popular in object-oriented programming, is called nullable types (often expressed as A?). The core difference between option types and nullable types is that option types support nesting (e.g. Maybe (Maybe String) ≠ Maybe String), while nullable types do not (e.g. String?? = String?).

== Theoretical aspects ==
In type theory, it may be written as: $A^{?} = A + 1$. This expresses the fact that for a given set of values in $A$, an option type adds exactly one additional value (the empty value) to the set of valid values for $A$. This is reflected in programming by the fact that in languages having tagged unions, option types can be expressed as the tagged union of the encapsulated type plus a unit type. An option type is a particular case of a tagged union, where the Nothing is taken as (nullary constructor for a) singleton type. Tagged unions can generally be implemented by a combination of union types and record types using occurrence typing.

The option type is also a monad where:

return = Just -- Wraps the value into a maybe

Nothing  >>= f = Nothing -- Fails if the previous monad fails
(Just x) >>= f = f x     -- Succeeds when both monads succeed

The monadic nature of the option type is useful for efficiently tracking failure and errors.

== Examples ==
=== Ada ===
Ada does not implement option-types directly, however it provides discriminated types which can be used to parameterize a record. To implement an Option type, a Boolean type is used as the discriminant; the following example provides a generic to create an option type from any non-limited constrained type:

generic
  -- Any constrained & non-limited type.
  type Element_Type is private;
package Optional_Type is
  -- When the discriminant, Has_Element, is true there is an element field,
  -- when it is false, there are no fields (hence the null keyword).
  type Optional (Has_Element : Boolean) is record
    case Has_Element is
      when False => Null;
      when True  => Element : Element_Type;
    end case;
  end record;
end Optional_Type;

Example usage:

   package Optional_Integers is new Optional_Type
      (Element_Type => Integer);
   Foo : Optional_Integers.Optional :=
      (Has_Element => True, Element => 5);
   Bar : Optional_Integers.Optional := 
      (Has_Element => False);

=== Agda ===
In Agda, the option type is named Maybe with variants nothing and just a.

=== ATS ===
In ATS, the option type is defined as

datatype option_t0ype_bool_type (a: t@ype+, bool) = 
	| Some(a, true) of a
 	| None(a, false)
stadef option = option_t0ype_bool_type
typedef Option(a: t@ype) = [b:bool] option(a, b)

#include "share/atspre_staload.hats"

fn show_value (opt: Option int): string =
	case+ opt of
	| None() => "No value"
	| Some(s) => tostring_int s

implement main0 (): void = let
	val full = Some 42
	and empty = None
in
	println!("show_value full → ", show_value full);
	println!("show_value empty → ", show_value empty);
end

show_value full → 42
show_value empty → No value

=== C++ ===
Since C++17, the option type is defined in the standard library as template <typename T> optional<T>.

import std;

using std::nullopt;
using std::optional;

constexpr optional<double> divide(double x, double y) noexcept {
	if (y != 0.0) {
		return x / y;
    }

	return nullopt;
}

void readDivisionResults(int x, int y) {
    optional<double> result = divide(x, y);
    if (result) {
        std::println("The quotient of x: {} and y: {} is {}.", x, y, result.value());
    } else {
        std::println("The quotient of x: {} and y: {} is undefined!", x, y);
    }
}

int main(int argc, char* argv[]) {
    readDivisionResults(1, 5);
    readDivisionResults(8, 0);
}

In C++23, support for monadic operations for std::optional<T> is available.

=== Elm ===
In Elm, the option type is defined as type Maybe a = Just a | Nothing.

=== F# ===
In F#, the option type is defined as type 'a option = None | Some of 'a.

let showValue =
    Option.fold (fun _ x -> sprintf "The value is: %d" x) "No value"

let full = Some 42
let empty = None

showValue full |> printfn "showValue full -> %s"
showValue empty |> printfn "showValue empty -> %s"

showValue full -> The value is: 42
showValue empty -> No value

=== Haskell ===
In Haskell, the option type is defined as data Maybe a = Nothing | Just a.

showValue :: Maybe Int -> String
showValue = foldl (\_ x -> "The value is: " ++ show x) "No value"

main :: IO ()
main = do
    let full = Just 42
    let empty = Nothing

    putStrLn $ "showValue full -> " ++ showValue full
    putStrLn $ "showValue empty -> " ++ showValue empty

showValue full -> The value is: 42
showValue empty -> No value

=== Idris ===
In Idris, the option type is defined as data Maybe a = Nothing | Just a.

showValue : Maybe Int -> String
showValue = foldl (\_, x => "The value is " ++ show x) "No value"

main : IO ()
main = do
    let full = Just 42
    let empty = Nothing

    putStrLn $ "showValue full -> " ++ showValue full
    putStrLn $ "showValue empty -> " ++ showValue empty

showValue full -> The value is: 42
showValue empty -> No value

=== Java ===
In Java, the option type is defined the standard library by the java.util.Optional<T> class.

import java.util.Optional;

public class OptionExample {
    static String showValue(Optional<Integer> opt) {
        return opt.map(x -> String.format("The value is: %d", x)).orElse("No value");
    }

    public static void main(String[] args) {
        Optional<Integer> full = Optional.of(42);
        Optional<Integer> empty = Optional.empty();

        System.out.printf("showValue(full): %s\n", showValue(full));
        System.out.printf("showValue(empty): %s\n", showValue(empty));
    }
}

showValue full -> The value is: 42
showValue empty -> No value

=== Nim ===
import std/options

proc showValue(opt: Option[int]): string =
  opt.map(proc (x: int): string = "The value is: " & $x).get("No value")

let
  full = some(42)
  empty = none(int)

echo "showValue(full) -> ", showValue(full)
echo "showValue(empty) -> ", showValue(empty)

showValue(full) -> The Value is: 42
showValue(empty) -> No value

=== OCaml ===
In OCaml, the option type is defined as type 'a option = None | Some of 'a. For example, the standard library function Sys.getenv_opt returns None when an environment variable is undefined, whereas Sys.getenv raises the Not_found exception.

let show_value =
  Option.fold ~none:"No value" ~some:(fun x -> "The value is: " ^ string_of_int x)

let () =
  let full = Some 42 in
  let empty = None in

  print_endline ("show_value full -> " ^ show_value full);
  print_endline ("show_value empty -> " ^ show_value empty)

show_value full -> The value is: 42
show_value empty -> No value

=== Rocq ===
In Rocq, the option type is defined as Inductive option (A:Type) : Type := | Some : A -> option A | None : option A..

=== Rust ===
In Rust, the option type is defined as enum Option<T> { None, Some(T) }.

fn show_value(opt: Option<i32>) -> String {
    opt.map_or("No value".to_owned(), |x: i32| format!("The value is: {}", x))
}

fn main() {
    let full: Option<i32> = Some(42);
    let empty: Option<i32> = None;

    println!("show_value(full) -> {}", show_value(full));
    println!("show_value(empty) -> {}", show_value(empty));
}

show_value(full) -> The value is: 42
show_value(empty) -> No value

=== Scala ===
In Scala, the option type is defined as sealed abstract class Option[+A], a type extended by final case class Some[+A](value: A) and case object None.

object Main:
  def showValue(opt: Option[Int]): String =
    opt.fold("No value")(x => s"The value is: $x")

  def main(args: Array[String]): Unit =
    val full = Some(42)
    val empty = None

    println(s"showValue(full) -> ${showValue(full)}")
    println(s"showValue(empty) -> ${showValue(empty)}")

showValue(full) -> The value is: 42
showValue(empty) -> No value

=== Standard ML ===
In Standard ML, the option type is defined as datatype 'a option = NONE | SOME of 'a.

=== Swift ===
In Swift, the option type is defined as enum Optional<T> { case none, some(T) } but is generally written as T?.

func showValue(_ opt: Int?) -> String {
    return opt.map { "The value is: \($0)" } ?? "No value"
}

let full = 42
let empty: Int? = nil

print("showValue(full) -> \(showValue(full))")
print("showValue(empty) -> \(showValue(empty))")

showValue(full) -> The value is: 42
showValue(empty) -> No value

=== Zig ===
In Zig, add ? before the type name like ?i32 to make it an optional type.

Payload n can be captured in an if or while statement, such as if (opt) |n| { ... } else { ... }, and an else clause is evaluated if it is null.

const std = @import("std");

fn showValue(gpa: std.mem.Allocator, opt: ?i32) ![]u8 {
    return if (opt) |n|
        std.fmt.allocPrint(gpa, "The value is: {}", .{n})
    else
        gpa.dupe(u8, "No value");
}

pub fn main(init: std.process.Init) !void {
    // Prepare the standard output stream.
    var buffer: [1024]u8 = undefined;
    var writer = std.Io.File.stdout().writer(init.io, &buffer);

    // Perform our example.
    const full = 42;
    const empty = null;

    const full_msg = try showValue(init.gpa, full);
    defer init.gpa.free(full_msg);
    try writer.interface.print("showValue(init.gpa, full) -> {s}\n", .{full_msg});

    const empty_msg = try showValue(init.gpa, empty);
    defer init.gpa.free(empty_msg);
    try writer.interface.print("showValue(init.gpa, empty) -> {s}\n", .{empty_msg});

    try writer.interface.flush();
}

showValue(init.gpa, full) -> The value is: 42
showValue(init.gpa, empty) -> No value

== See also ==
- Result type
- Tagged union
- Nullable type
- Null object pattern
- Exception handling
- Pattern matching
