= Verus =

Verus may refer to:

== People ==
- Verus (gladiator) (fl. 80), Roman gladiator
- Verus (senator) (died 219), Roman centurion and senator
- Gnaeus Julius Verus (born c. 112), Roman general and senator
- Lucius Verus (130–169), Roman co-emperor with Marcus Aurelius
- Marcus Annius Verus (disambiguation)
  - Marcus Annius Verus, birth name of Roman emperor Marcus Aurelius (121–180)
  - Marcus Annius Verus (praetor) (died 124), Roman politician and father of Marcus Aurelius
  - Marcus Annius Verus (grandfather of Marcus Aurelius) (died 138), Roman consul

== Other uses ==
- Verus (proof system), a system for formally verifying software written in Rust
- Alex Verus, a series by Benedict Jacka

== See also ==
- Ver (disambiguation)
- Vera (disambiguation)
- Vere (disambiguation)
- WER (disambiguation)
- Wehr (disambiguation)
