= Vere =

Vere may refer to:

== Surname ==
- Charles Broke Vere (1779–1843), British soldier and Member of Parliament
- Charlotte Vere, Baroness Vere of Norbiton (born 1969), British politician
- Francis Vere (1560–1609), English soldier
- Horace Vere, 1st Baron Vere of Tilbury (1565–1635), English military leader

== Given name ==
- Wilbert Vere Awdry (1911–1997), creator of Thomas the Tank Engine
- Vere Beauclerk, 1st Baron Vere (1699–1781), British peer and politician
- Vere Benett-Stanford (1840–1894), MP for Shaftesbury
- Vere Bird (1910–1999), first Prime Minister of Antigua and Barbuda
- Vere Gordon Childe (1892–1957), Australian archaeologist and philologist
- William Vere Cruess (1886–1968), American food scientist
- Vere Fane, 4th Earl of Westmorland (1645–1693), British peer and MP for Peterborough and for Kent
- Vere Fane, 5th Earl of Westmorland (1678–1698), British peer and member of the House of Lords
- Vere Fane (MP) (fl. 1818), MP for Petersfield and Lyme Regis
- Vere Bonamy Fane (1863–1924), general in the British Indian Army
- Vere Fane, 14th Earl of Westmorland (1893–1948), British peer and equestrian
- Vere Harmsworth, 3rd Viscount Rothermere (1925–1998), founder of the Mail on Sunday
- Arthur Vere Harvey, Baron Harvey of Prestbury (1906–1994), British politician
- Vere Hobart, Lord Hobart (1818– 875), British colonial administrator
- Henry Vere Huntley (1795–1864), English naval officer and colonial administrator
- William Vere Reeve King-Fane (1868–1943), English landowner, soldier and High Sheriff of Lincolnshire
- Vere Johns (1893–1966), impresario and radio personality
- Vere Lorrimer (died 1998), British television producer and director
- Vere Monckton-Arundell, Viscountess Galway (1859–1921), British poet and philanthropist
- Vere Ponsonby, 9th Earl of Bessborough (1880–1956), British Conservative Party politician
- Vere St. Leger Goold (1853–1909), Irish tennis champion

== Other uses ==
- Vere (footballer) (Alejandro Asensio Crespillo; born 2000), Spanish footballer
- Vere (river), in Georgia
- Vere (ship), any one of several vessels named Vere
- Vere Island, a former community of Newfoundland, Canada
- Vere language
- Egwene al'Vere, a character of the Wheel of Time fantasy series by Robert Jordan
- Xaver Hohenleiter, German brigand also known as Schwaaz Vere

== See also ==
- Vere Street (disambiguation)
- De Vere (disambiguation)
- Ver (disambiguation)
- Vera (disambiguation)
- Verus (disambiguation)
- Wehr (disambiguation)
- WER (disambiguation)
