= Wehr =

Wehr may refer to:

- WEHR, a former radio station owned by Penn State University
- Wehr, Baden-Württemberg, Germany
- Wehr, Rhineland-Palatinate, Germany
- Wehr, a village in Selfkant, North Rhine-Westphalia, Germany

== People with the surname ==
- Dick Wehr (1925–2011), American professional basketball player
- Hans Wehr (1909–1981), German Arabist
- Julian Wehr (1898–1970), American author of children's books
- Marcus Wehr (born 2000), American football player
- Todd Wehr (1889–1965), American industrialist and philanthropist
- Wesley Wehr (1929–2004), American palaeontologist
- Thomas Wehr, American psychiatrist

== See also ==
- Ver (disambiguation)
- Vera (disambiguation)
- Vere (disambiguation)
- Verus (disambiguation)
- WER (disambiguation)
