= Singly rooted hierarchy =

Inheritance hierarchy with a universal common ancestor class

The singly rooted hierarchy, in object-oriented programming, is a characteristic of most (but not all) object-oriented programming languages. In most such languages, in fact, all classes inherit directly or indirectly from a single root, usually with a name similar to Object; all classes then form a common inheritance hierarchy.

This idea was introduced first by Smalltalk, and was since used in most other object-oriented languages (notably Java with java.lang.Object and C# with System.Object). In C#, it can just be expressed with the object keyword. This feature is especially useful for container libraries - they only need to allow putting an Object in a container to allow objects of any class to be put in the container.

A notable exception is C++, where (mainly for compatibility with C and efficiency) there is no single object hierarchy. Containers in C++ have been implemented with multiple inheritance, and with help of template-based generic programming by Bjarne Stroustrup. Although no root class exists in C++, there is an any type, std::any, which acts as a type-erased container; Rust also features a similar std::any::Any type-erased any type. Also, like in C, a void* may point to any object. Other object-oriented languages without a singly rooted hierarchy include Objective-C and PHP.

== See also ==
- Top type
