= Fail fast =

Fail fast may refer to:

- Fail fast (business), a concept in business management
- Fail-fast system, a concept in systems design
