= WER =

WER or Wer may refer to:

- Wer (god), an Akkadian god
- Wer (film), a 2013 horror film
- Were, an archaic term for adult men
- Weak echo region, in meteorology, an area of markedly lower reflectivity within thunderstorms resulting from an increase in updraft strength
- Werribee railway station, Melbourne
- Western Entrance to the Riedbahn, the western approach of the Riedbahn in Mannheim, Germany
- Wiki Educational Resources Limited, the legal name of the first Wikimedia UK chapter
- Windows Error Reporting, a feature of Windows XP and later operating systems
- Word error rate, in computational linguistics, a common metric of measuring the performance of a speech recognition system

== See also ==
- Ver (disambiguation)
- Vera (disambiguation)
- Vere (disambiguation)
- Verus (disambiguation)
- Wehr (disambiguation)
