= Veira =

Veira may refer to:

- Veira, a historically used name for Wyre, Orkney Islands, Scotland, UK
- Héctor Veira (born 1946), Argentine footballer

== See also ==
- Vera (disambiguation)
