= Fail-silent system =

A fail-silent system is a type of system that either provides the correct service, or provides no service at all (becomes silent).

== See also ==
- Design by contract
- Fail-fast system
- Fail-safe
- Fail-stop
- Fault tolerance
