= Project Verona =

Experimental programming language

- Paradigm: Safe infrastructure programming
- Family: Rust-like
- Designed by: Microsoft Research, Imperial College London
- First appeared: 2019; 6 years ago
- Platform: Cross-platform
- OS: Linux, Windows, Darwin
- License: MIT License
- Filename extensions: .verona
- Website: www.microsoft.com/en-us/research/project/project-verona (GitHub)

Influenced by
- Rust, Cyclone, Pony

Project Verona is an experimental research programming language developed by Microsoft.

The project is being supported by C# project manager Mads Torgensen and Microsoft Research Cambridge research software engineer Juliana Franco. Project Verona is also being aided by academics at Imperial College London. Unlike in Rust where the ownership model is based on a single object, it is based on groups of objects in Verona.

According to Microsoft, the goal of the project is to create a safer platform for memory management.

Project Verona is open source released under MIT License and is under active development on GitHub.

== Example ==
while_sum(x: List[U32]) : U32
{
  var sum: U32 = 0;
  let iter = x.values();

  while { iter.has_value() }
  {
    // This has to be `a`, same as in the for loop above
    let a = iter();

    // Increments the iterator
    next iter;

    // This is the body of the for loop
    sum = sum + a
  }

  sum
}

== See also ==
- List of programming language researchers
- Go (programming language)
- Rust (programming language)
- Cyclone (programming language)
- Pony (programming language)
