= Unit type =

Type that allows only one value

In the area of mathematical logic and computer science known as type theory, a unit type is a type that allows only one value (and thus can hold no information). The carrier (underlying set) associated with a unit type can be any singleton set. There is an isomorphism between any two such sets, so it is customary to talk about the unit type and ignore the details of its value. One may also regard the unit type as the type of 0-tuples, i.e. the product of no types.

The unit type is the terminal object in the category of types and typed functions. It should not be confused with the zero or empty type, which allows no values and is the initial object in this category. Similarly, the Boolean is the type with two values.

The unit type is implemented in most functional programming languages. The void type that is used in some imperative programming languages serves some of its functions, but because its carrier set is empty, it has some limitations (as detailed below).

== In programming languages ==
Several computer programming languages provide a unit type to specify the result type of a function with the sole purpose of causing a side effect, and the argument type of a function that does not require arguments.

- In Haskell, Rust, and Elm, the unit type is called () and its only value is also (), reflecting the 0-tuple interpretation.
- In ML descendants (including OCaml, Standard ML, and F#), the type is called unit but the value is written as ().
- In Scala, the unit type is called Unit and its only value is written as ().
- In Common Lisp the type named NULL is a unit type which has one value, namely the symbol NIL. This should not be confused with the NIL type, which is the bottom type.
- In Python, there is a type called NoneType which allows the single value of None. In Python's optional static type annotations, this type is represented as None.
- In Swift, the unit type is called Void or () and its only value is also (), reflecting the 0-tuple interpretation.
- In Java, the unit type is called Void and its only value is null. It cannot be instantiated. It is used in generics for denoting return types of void.
- In Go, the unit type is written struct{} and its value is struct{}{}.
- In PHP, the unit type is called null, which only value is NULL itself.
- In JavaScript, both Null (its only value is null) and Undefined (its only value is undefined) are built-in unit types.
- in Kotlin, Unit is a singleton with only one value: the Unit object.
- In Ruby, nil is the only instance of the NilClass class.
- In C++, the std::monostate unit type was added in C++17. Before that std::nullptr_t in C++11 was already a unit type, and it is always possible to define a custom unit type using an empty struct such as struct Empty {}.
- In Dart, both Null and the empty record ((), since Dart 3) have a single possible value, respectively, null and ().

=== Void type as unit type ===
In C, C++, C#, D, and PHP, void is used to designate a function that does not return anything useful, or a function that accepts no arguments. The unit type in C is conceptually similar to an empty struct, but a struct without members is not allowed in the C language specification (this is allowed in C++). Instead, 'void' is used in a manner that simulates some, but not all, of the properties of the unit type, as detailed below. Like most imperative languages, C allows functions that do not return a value; these are specified as having the void return type. Such functions are called procedures in other imperative languages like Pascal, where a syntactic distinction, instead of type-system distinction, is made between functions and procedures.

==== Difference in calling convention ====
The first notable difference between a true unit type and the void type is that the unit type may always be the type of the argument to a function, but the void type cannot be the type of an argument in C, despite the fact that it may appear as the sole argument in the list. This problem is best illustrated by the following program, which is a compile-time error in C:

void f(void) {}
void g(void) {}

int main(void) {
    f(g()); // compile-time error here
    return 0;
}

This issue does not arise in most programming practice in C, because since the void type carries no information, it is useless to pass it anyway; but it may arise in generic programming, such as C++ templates, where void must be treated differently from other types. In C++ however, empty classes are allowed, so it is possible to implement a real unit type; the above example becomes compilable as:

class UnitType {};
constexpr UnitType UNIT;

UnitType f(UnitType) noexcept { 
    return UNIT; 
}

UnitType g(UnitType) noexcept { 
    return UNIT; 
}

int main() {
    f(g(UNIT));
    return 0;
}

For brevity, UNIT is not implemented as a singleton; see singleton pattern for further explanation on singleton units.

==== Difference in storage ====
The second notable difference is that the void type is special and can never be stored in a record type, i.e. in a struct or a class in C/C++. In contrast, the unit type can be stored in records in functional programming languages, i.e. it can appear as the type of a field; the above implementation of the unit type in C++ can also be stored. While this may seem a useless feature, it does allow one for instance to elegantly implement a set as a map to the unit type; in the absence of a unit type, one can still implement a set this way by storing some dummy value of another type for each key.

==== In Generics ====
In Java Generics, type parameters must be reference types. The wrapper type Void is often used when a unit type parameter is needed.

import java.util.concurrent.*;

ExecutorService executorService = Executors.newFixedThreadPool(2);

CompletableFuture<Void> future = CompletableFuture.runAsync(() -> {
    try {
        // Simulate some work
        System.out.println("Task started.");
        Thread.sleep(2000); // Simulate a 2-second task
        System.out.println("Task completed.");
    } catch (InterruptedException e) {
        System.err.println("Task was interrupted.");
    }
}, executorService);

Although the Void type can never have any instances, it does have one value, null (like all other reference types), so it acts as a unit type. In practice, any other non-instantiable type, e.g. Math, can also be used for this purpose, since they also have exactly one value, null.

public static Void f(Void x) { 
    return null; 
}

public static Void g(Void x) { 
    return null; 
}

public static void main(String[] args) {
    f(g(null));
}

=== Null type ===
Statically typed languages give a type to every possible expression. They need to associate a type to the null expression. A type will be defined for null and it will only have this value.

For example in D, it is possible to declare functions that may only return null (in fact, typeof(null) is void):

typeof(null) returnThatSpecialThing() {
    return null;
}

void writeTypeOfNull() {
    writeln(typeof(null)); // prints: void
}

null is the only value that typeof(null), a unit type, can have.

== See also ==
- Any type
- Bottom type
- Singleton pattern (where a particular class has only one instance, but narrowly typed non-nullable references to it are usually not held by other classes)
- Undefined value
- Void type
