= Crt0 =

Set of execution startup routines linked into a C program

crt0 (also known as c0) is a set of execution startup routines linked into a C program that performs any initialization work required before calling the program's main function. After the main function completes, control returns to crt0, which calls the library function exit with the return code of the main function to terminate the process.

== Form and usage ==
Crt0 generally takes the form of an object file called crt0.o, often originally written in assembly language, which is automatically included by the linker into every executable file it builds.

crt0 contains the most basic parts of the runtime library. As such, the exact work it performs depends on the program's compiler, operating system and C standard library implementation. Beside the initialization work required by the environment and toolchain, crt0 can perform additional operations defined by the programmer, such as executing C++ global constructors and C functions carrying GCC's ((constructor)) attribute.

Usually, crt0 does not contain more complex initialization code like the previously mentioned calling of functions carrying GCC's ((constructor)) attribute. Most modern libc implementations use __libc_start_main, a function written in C, to handle more complex tasks.

"crt" stands for "C runtime", and the zero stands for "the very beginning". However, when programs are compiled using GCC, it is also used for languages other than C. Alternative versions of crt0 are available for special usage scenarios; for example, to enable profiling with gprof, programs must be compiled with gcrt0 instead.

== Example crt0.s ==
This example is for Linux x86-64 with AT&T syntax, without an actual C runtime.

.text

.globl _start

_start: # _start is the entry point known to the linker
    xor %ebp, %ebp            # effectively RBP := 0, mark the end of stack frames
    mov (%rsp), %edi          # get argc from the stack (implicitly zero-extended to 64-bit)
    lea 8(%rsp), %rsi         # take the address of argv from the stack
    lea 16(%rsp,%rdi,8), %rdx # take the address of envp from the stack
    xor %eax, %eax            # per ABI and compatibility with icc
    call main                 # %edi, %rsi, %rdx are the three args (of which first two are C standard) to main

    mov %eax, %edi    # transfer the return of main to the first argument of _exit
    xor %eax, %eax    # per ABI and compatibility with icc
    call _exit        # terminate the program

== See also ==
- Entry point
- Runtime system
