= Ver =

Ver or VER may refer to:

- Voluntary Export Restraints, in international trade
- VER, the IATA airport code for Veracruz International Airport
- Volk's Electric Railway, Brighton, England
- VerPublishing, of the German group VDM Publishing, reproduces Wikipedia content
- Voluntary Emission Reduction (or Verified Emission Reduction), used for carbon credits
- Ver (command), a shell command in DOS, Windows etc.
- an abbreviation for "versine", a trigonometric function
- ver (function prefix) (versus), a prefix for versed trigonometric functions in mathematics
- an abbreviation for "version"
- places in France:
  - Ver, Manche, in the Manche département
  - Ver-lès-Chartres, in the Eure-et-Loir département
  - Ver-sur-Launette, in the Oise département
  - Ver-sur-Mer, in the Calvados département
- River Ver, in Hertfordshire, United Kingdom
- Ver, Belgium, a small village in the municipality of Houyet, Belgium
- Roger Ver, a Bitcoin entrepreneur
- Ver (music), songs in pre-marriage ceremonies in Goa

== See also ==
- Vera (disambiguation)
- Vere (disambiguation)
- Verus (disambiguation)
- WER (disambiguation)
- Wehr (disambiguation)
