= Veras =

Veras is a surname. Notable people with the surname include:

- Darío Veras, Dominican Republic baseball player
- Jorge Veras (born 1959), Brazilian football player
- José Veras (born 1980), Dominican Republic baseball player
- Quilvio Veras (born 1971), Dominican Republic baseball player
- Wilton Veras (born 1978), Dominican Republic baseball player
- Zoska Veras (1892–1991), Belarusian writer

== See also ==
- Verás, the Spanish version of the 1995 Madonna song "You'll See"
