= Marcus Annius Verus =

Marcus Annius Verus may refer to:

- Marcus Annius Verus (grandfather of Marcus Aurelius)
- Marcus Annius Verus (father of Marcus Aurelius)
- Marcus Annius Verus, emperor as Marcus Aurelius
- Marcus Annius Verus Caesar
