= Vere Street =

Vere Street may refer to:

- Vere Street, Westminster, a street off Oxford Street, London
- Vere Street Coterie, a group of men convicted of sodomy offenses in the 19th century
