= Vere (ship) =

Several ships have been named Vere:

- Vere (1781 ship) was a British ship launched in 1774 as Fanny, and was renamed in 1781. She spent much of her career, under either name, as a West Indiaman. She was last listed in 1796.
- Vere (1790 ship) may have been a whaler in the British Southern Whale Fishery between 1790 and 1793. She never appeared in Lloyd's Register or Lloyd's List so little is known about her origins and fate. Some records state that she was built in 1774, but it is not clear under what name. She appears in a list of ships owned by Daniel Bennett & Son, and her master for her intended whaling voyage was Robert Blyth, though she may have been sold and renamed before sailing.
- Vere (1803 ship) was launched in 1803 in Hull but first appeared in Lloyd's Register (LR) only in 1812. She was last listed in 1818. There is no evidence from Lloyd's List or press mentions that she ever sailed, let alone as a whaler in the British Southern Whale Fishery.
- Vere (1811 ship) was a barque, launched in Chester, England as a West Indiaman. She also traded with Africa and Canada. She went aground and was condemned in March 1843 in New Brunswick, British North America.
