= Vera (Edgarian novel) =

2021 novel by Carol Edgarian

Vera by Carol Edgarian
- First edition cover
- Author: Carol Edgarian
- Language: English
- Genre: Novel
- Publisher: Scribner
- Publication date: March 2, 2021
- Publication place: United States
- Media type: Print (hardback)
- Pages: 336 pages
- ISBN: 1501157523

Vera is the third novel by writer, editor, and publisher Carol Edgarian.

== Plot summary ==
Set in San Francisco in 1906, Vera tells the story of a fifteen-year-old girl, the daughter of the town’s leading madam, coming of age in the aftermath of the city’s devastating earthquake and fire and centers on themes of displacement, societal upheaval, and reinvention with a cinematic cast of well known as well as fictional characters.

== Critical reception ==
Edgarian’s third novel Vera (2021) was an O Magazine Most Anticipated Read, an Indiebound Pick of the Month, and was described in a Booklist Starred Review as “Brilliantly conceived and beautifully realized”. The Los Angeles Review of Books wrote about Vera: “If there’s a book that speaks urgently to a time of grief, resilience, wounding loneliness, and collective hope in one of the deadliest pandemics in history, it is Vera — a work to be cherished for what it uncovers in the pages and, possibly, the heart of the reader.”
