= Vera =

Vera may refer to:

== Names ==
- Vera (surname), a surname (including a list of people with the name)
- Vera (given name), a given name (including a list of people and fictional characters with the name)
  - Vera (fl. 693–694), archbishop of the archdiocese of Tarragona

== Places ==
=== Spain ===
- Vera, Almería, a municipality in the province of Almería, Andalusia
- Vera de Bidasoa, a municipality in the autonomous community of Navarra
- La Vera, a comarca in the province of Cáceres, Extremadura

=== United States ===
- Vera, Illinois, an unincorporated community
- Vera, Kansas, a ghost town
- Vera, Missouri, an unincorporated community
- Vera, Oklahoma, a town
- Vera, Texas, an unincorporated community
- Vera, Virginia, an unincorporated community
- Veradale, Washington, originally known as Vera, CDP

=== Elsewhere ===
- Vera, Santa Fe, a city in the province of Santa Fe, Argentina
- Vera Department, an administrative subdivision (departamento) of the province of Santa Fe
- Vera, Mato Grosso, Brazil, a municipality
- Cape Vera, Nunavut, Canada, an uninhabited headland on Devon Island
- Vera, Croatia, a village
- Vera, Italy, a frazione in Cortina d'Ampezzo, Veneto
- Vera, Norway, a village in the municipality of Verdal in Trøndelag county, Norway

== Arts and entertainment ==
=== Film and television ===
- Vera (1986 film), a Brazilian drama film
- Vera (2022 film), an Austrian-Italian docudrama
- Vera (TV series), a British detective series

=== Literature ===
- Vera; or, The Nihilists, an 1883 play by Oscar Wilde
- Vera (von Arnim novel), a 1921 novel by Elizabeth von Arnim
- Vera (Edgarian novel), a 2021 novel by Carol Edgarian
- Véra (Mrs. Vladimir Nabokov), a 1999 biography by Stacy Schiff

=== Music ===
- Vera, a 2017 album by Crooked Colours
- "Vera" (song), a 1979 song by Pink Floyd

== Other uses ==
- Avro Lancaster FM213, known as VeRA
- Vision Electronic Recording Apparatus, an early videotape recording system
- VERA passive sensor, a Czech passive sensor system
- 245 Vera, an asteroid
- Bitstream Vera, a family of typefaces
- Typhoon Vera, a 1959 tropical cyclone
- The Vera Project, a music-based, non-profit organization in Seattle, Washington
- Vera Institute of Justice, a non-profit organization advocating for criminal justice reform
- Vienna Environmental Research Accelerator, a particle accelerator
- Vera or Verawood, the wood of Bulnesia trees
- Vera (horse), winner of the 1883 Kentucky Oaks
- Vera (Groningen), a pop center in the city of Groningen, see music venues in the Netherlands
- Vera C. Rubin Observatory, an astronomical observatory in Chile
- The VERA Project (VLBI Exploration of Radio Astronomy), of the National Astronomical Observatory of Japan
- WDR VERA, a defunct German radio station

== See also ==
- Tropical Storm Vera
- Veras
- Veracruz (disambiguation)
- Vere (disambiguation)
- Ver (disambiguation)
- VeraCrypt, a free and open source encryption software forked from TrueCrypt.
