= Dynamic binding =

Dynamic binding may refer to:

- Dynamic binding (computing), also known as late binding
- Dynamic binding (chemistry)

== See also ==
- Dynamic dispatch
- Dynamic linking
- Scope (computer science)#Dynamic scoping in programming languages
