= Static build =

A static build is a compiled version of a program which has been statically linked against libraries.

== Linking ==
In computer science, linking means taking one or more objects generated by compilers and assembling them into a single executable program. The objects are program modules containing machine code and symbol definitions, which come in two varieties:

- Defined or exported symbols are functions or variables that are present in the module represented by the object, and which should be available for use by other modules.
- Undefined or imported symbols are functions or variables that are called or referenced by this object, but not internally defined.

A linker program then resolves references to undefined symbols by finding out which other object defines a symbol in question, and replacing placeholders with the symbol's address. Linkers can take objects from a collection called a library. The final program does not include the whole library, only those objects from it that are needed. Libraries for diverse purposes exist, and one or more system libraries are usually linked in by default.

== Dynamic linking ==
Modern operating system environments allow dynamic linking, or the postponing of the resolving of some undefined symbols until a program is run. That means that the executable still contains undefined symbols, plus a list of objects or libraries that will provide definitions for these. Loading the program will load these objects/libraries as well, and perform a final linking.

Dynamic linking offers three advantages:

- Often-used libraries (for example the standard system library) need to be stored in only one location, not duplicated in every single binary.
- If a library is upgraded or replaced, all programs using it dynamically will immediately benefit from the corrections. Static builds would have to be re-linked first.
- The binary executable file size is smaller than its statically linked counterpart.

== Static building ==
In a statically built program, no dynamic linking occurs: all the bindings have been done at compile time.

Static builds have a very predictable behavior (because they do not rely on the particular version of libraries available on the final system), and are commonly found in forensic and security tools to avoid possible contamination or malfunction due to broken libraries on the examined machine. The same flexibility that permits an upgraded library to benefit all dynamically-linked applications can also prevent applications that assume the presence of a specific version of a particular library from running correctly. If every application on a system must have its own copy of a dynamic library to ensure correct operation, the benefits of dynamic linking are moot.

Another benefit of static builds is their portability: once the final executable file has been compiled, it is no longer necessary to keep the library files that the program references, since all the relevant parts are copied into the executable file. As a result, when installing a statically-built program on a computer, the user doesn't have to download and install additional libraries: the program is ready to run.

== See also ==
- Static library
- Library
- Name decoration
- Relocation table
- Runtime library
- Runtime system
