= Rebasing =

Process of modifying data based on one reference to another

In computing, rebasing is the process of modifying data based on one reference to another. It can be one of the following:

== Shared libraries ==
Rebasing is the process of creating a shared library image in such a way that it is guaranteed to use virtual memory without conflicting with any other shared libraries loadable in the system.

IBM VM/370 discontinuous saved segments (DCSS) were an early example of this technique, though not called rebasing. The technique is used extensively on Win32 platforms to avoid the overhead of address relocation of system DLLs by the loader.

Some security extensions to Linux/x86 use rebasing to force the use of code addresses below 0x00ffffff in order to introduce a 0x00 byte into all code pointers; This eliminates a certain class of buffer overflow security problems related to improper checking of null-terminated strings, common in the C programming language.

== Other uses ==
- Rebasing is the act of moving changesets to a different branch when using a revision control system or in some systems, by synchronizing a branch with the originating branch by merging all new changes in the latter to the former. For example, Git and Darcs do this (but Darcs extends the concept and calls it "patch commutation").
- The daylight saving time (DST) rebasing tool TZMOVE.EXE contained in Microsoft Exchange and Outlook uses to recalculate and reschedule appointment dates that are affected by DST.

== See also ==
- Relocation (computing)
- Position-independent code
- Portable Executable (PE)
- High memory area (HMA)
- Dynamic dead-code elimination
