= IBM SMS =

IBM SMS may stand for several IBM products, systems, or technologies:

== Hardware ==
- Standard Modular System

== Operating systems ==
- Data Facility Storage Management Subsystem (MVS)
- System Managed Storage in DFSMS for MVS
