= PLT =

PLT may stand for:

- Freedom and Justice (Partija Laisvė ir Teisingumas), a former political party in Lithuania, now the Centre-Right Union (Centro dešinės sąjunga, or CDS)
- Patent Law Treaty, a treaty adopted by the World Intellectual Property Organization (WIPO)
- Plantronics, an American electronics company, now Poly, and whose NYSE ticker symbol changed from "PLT" to "POLY" in 2021
- Platelet count, in blood test reports
- Power-line telecommunications, or Power-line communication (PLC)
- Princeton Large Torus, an early nuclear fusion reactor (tokamak), in Princeton, New Jersey, United States, operational from 1975 to 1986
- Programming language theory, in computer science
- PLT Scheme, a programming language which influenced Racket
- PrettyLittleThing, a UK-based fast-fashion retailer
- Procedure Linkage Table, a programming concept related to GOT.
