= Passive binding =

Physical organic complexation catalysis chemistry term

In complexation catalysis, the term passive binding refers to any stabilizing interaction that is equally strong at the transition state level and in the reactant-catalyst complex.

Having the same effect on the stability of the transition state and the reactant-catalyst complex, passive binding contributes to acceleration only if the equilibrium between the unassociated reactant and catalyst and their complex is not completely shifted to the right. It was defined by A.J. Kirby in 1996 as opposed to the dynamic binding, i.e. the whole of interactions that are stronger at the transition state level than in the reactant-catalyst complex.

== See also ==
- Catalysis
