= Dynamic binding (chemistry) =

Physical organic complexation catalysis chemistry term

In complexation catalysis, the term dynamic binding refers to any stabilizing interaction that is stronger at the transition state level than in the reactant-catalyst complex.

Being directly related to transition state stabilization, dynamic binding is the very hearth of complexation catalysis. It was defined by A.J. Kirby in 1996 as opposed to the passive binding, i.e. the whole of interactions that are equally strong at the reactant and the transition state level.

== See also ==
- Catalysis
