= Data Facility Storage Management Subsystem (MVS) =

Data Facility products for OS/VS1 and MVS

Data Facility Storage Management Subsystem (Note: While the syntax for an Automatic Class Selection (ACS) is similar, Data Facility Storage Management Subsystem/VM in z/VM manages a different set of resources and uses different code for I/O.) (DFSMS) is a central component of IBM's flagship operating system z/OS. It includes access methods, utilities and program management functions. Data Facility Storage Management Subsystem is also a collective name for a collection of several products, all but two of which are included in the DFSMS/MVS product.

== History ==
In 1972 IBM announced the first release of the OS/VS2 operating system for the IBM System 370 systems; that release later was known as Single Virtual Storage (SVS). In 1974 IBM announced release 2.0; that release and all subsequent releases became known as Multiple Virtual Storage (MVS). All releases of OS/VS2 were available to no charge because the software cost was bundled with the hardware cost. OS/VS2 Release 3.8 was the last free release of MVS.

In the late seventies and early eighties IBM announced:

5740-XE1 MVS/System Extensions (MVS/SE)
MVS/SE improves the performance and RAS of OS/VS2 (MVS)
5740-AM6 Data Facility Device Support (DFDS) for OS/VS1
5740-AM7 Data Facility Device Support (DFDS) for MVS
DFDS supports an indexed VTOC, and with the proper PTF supports the Speed Matching Buffer on the IBM 3880.

5740-XYQ Data Facility Extended Function (DFEF)
DFEF offers a new type of VSAM catalog, but had reliability problems that were only resolved in DFP.

5740-AM3 Sequential Access Method Extended (SAM-E)
SAM-E improves the performance of BPAM, BSAM and QSAM on direct access storage devices.

5740-AM8 Access Method Services Cryptographic Option

5748-UT2 Offline 3800 Utility

In June 1980, IBM announced MVS/System Product (MVS/SP) as a replacement for MVS/SE.

On October 21, 1981, IBM announced new Kxx models of the 3081, supporting a new architecture known as System/370 Extended Architecture (370-XA). IBM also announced MVS/Extended Architecture (MVS/XA), consisting of MVS/SP Version 2 and a corequisite new product, Data Facility Product (DFP), 5665-284, replacing (Note: DFP replace these products in their entirety: 5740-AM7 Data Facility Device Support (DFDS); 5740-XYQ Data Facility Extended Function (DFEF); 5740-AM3 Sequential Access Method Extended (SAM-E); 5740-AM8 Access Method Services Cryptographic Option; 5748-UT2 Offline 3800 Utility) five of the products listed above, the linkage editor and the loader.

On May 17, 1983, IBM announced MVS/370 Data Facility Product (MVS/370 DFP), 5665-295, for MVS/SP Version 1 Release 3, replacing the same five programs as DFP for MVS/XA.

On February 5, 1985, IBM announced MVS/XA Data Facility Product (MVS/XA DFP) Version 2, 5655-XA2, as a replacement for MVS/XA Data Facility Product Version 1, 5665-284. DFP replaced BDAM, BPAM, BSAM, ISAM, QSAM and VSAM.

On February 15, 1988 IBM announced MVS/System Product Version 3 (MVS/ESA), it also announced MVS/Data Facility Product Version 3 (MVS/DFP), 5665-XA3; MVS/SP V3 required either MVS/XA Data Facility Product Version 2, 5655-XA2, or Version 3. More recent releases were corequisites for MVS/ESA SP Version 4 and MVS/ESA SP Version 5.

On April 19, 1988, IBM announced the umbrella term Data Facility Storage Management Subsystem for facilities provided by the programs

- IBM MVS/Data Facility Product (MVS/DFP) Version 3 Release 1.0
- IBM Data Facility Data Set Services (Note: DSS cannot read dumps produced by IEHDASDR or by 5740-UT1, Direct Access Storage Dump Restore (DASDR).) (DFDSS) Version 2 Release 4.0
- IBM Data Facility Hierarchical Storage Manager (DFHSM) Version 2 Release 4.0
- IBM Resource Access Control Facility (RACF) Release 8.1
- IBM Data Facility Sort (DFSORT) Release 10.0

In addition to replacing part of the device support in the base MVS/SP, DFP replaces the Linkage Editor and several utility programs and service aids.

DFP is no longer available as a separate product, but has become part of Data Facility Storage Management Subsystem, under the name DFSMSdfp.

On May 19, 1992, IBM announced DFSMS/MVS, 5695-DF1, replacing MVS/Data Facility Product (MVS/DFP) Version 3, 5665-XA3, Data Facility Hierarchical Storage Manager (DFHSM) Version 2, 5665-329; and Data Facility Data Set Services (DFDSS) Version 2, 5665-327. DFSMS/MVS also replaced utilities and service aids. DSDSS and DFHSM became optional chargeable features of DFSMS; DFSORT and RACF remained separate products. While DFSMS/MVS Release 1 still included ISAM, IBM eventually dropped it, but continued to support the ISAM compatibility interface to VSAM. DFSMS/MVS R1 included the optional Removeable Media Manager (DFSMSrmm), which supports both manual tape libraries and the 3495 Tape Library Dataserver.

On March 1, 1994, IBM announced DFSMS/MVS Release 2.

On May 30, 1995, IBM announced DFSMS/MVS Release 3.

On September 10, 1996, IBM announced DFSMS/MVS Release 4.

On June 9, 1997, IBM announced DFSMS/MVS Release 5.

== Components ==
This section describes features of DFSMS from the perspective of z/OS; it does not distinguish between features added by, e.g., DFDS, and features added in the latest release of z/OS.

=== DFSMSdss ===
DFSMSdss (Note: Originally a separate product called Data Facility Data Set Services (DFDSS), 5740-UT3.) is a chargeable feature of DFSMS that can dump and restore selected data sets and selected volumes based on specifications in control statements. It is also referred to in documentation as a data mover. DSS replaces the older DASDR and the dump/restore facilities of IEHDASDR, although the dump formats are not compatible.

=== DFSMSdfp ===
DFSMSdfp (Note: Originally called Data Facility Product.) replaces the older direct, index and sequential access methods, the utilities and service aids, the linkage editor, the loader and program fetch. It is the component to which new device support code is added. DFSMSdfp adds a number of loosely related facilities.

==== Indexed VTOC ====
The VTOC structure inherited from OS/360 uses records with 44 byte keys, and a sequential search using a Search Key Equal/TIC *-8 loop. The VTOC Index (VTOCIX) is an optional data set that indexes Data Set Control Blocks (DSCBs) and allows a faster search.

==== ICF catalog ====
The Improved Catalog Facility (ICF) replaces the OS/360 Control Volume (CVOL) and the VSAM catalog with a more resilient catalog structure.

==== PDSE ====
Partitoned Data Set Extended (PDSE) is a new type of dataset that resolves several issues with the old PDS organization but that can be read and written by existing BPAM, BSAM and QSAM code.

==== System Managed Storage ====
System Managed Storage (SMS) is a set of facilities for controlling the placement, migration and retention of datasets on direct access storage devices that is more flexible than older methods, e.g., VOL=SER specifications in JCL. Prior to SMS, the installations defined unit names during system generation, (Note: Eventually IBM replaced the sysgen method of defining device names with the new MVSCP and HCD programs.) and two pools of DASD volumes, called PUBLIC and STORAGE, in a member of the system parameter library. In addition, users had to explicitly define characteristics of new datasets.

With SMS, an installation can define and update several types of lists, described by IBM as

Data Class
Data definition parameters
Storage Class
Availability and accessibility requirements
Management Class
Data migration, backup, and retention attributes
Storage Group
List of storage volumes with common properties
Aggregate Group
Backup or recovery of all data sets in a group in a single operation
Copy Pool

The installation can also define automatic class selection (ACS) rules that can test, e.g., data set name, and select list names based on installation policies and user requests. A common scenario is for the installation to write a storage group ACS routine to ignore any UNIT parameter and to select the storage group, and to write a DATACLASS ACS rule to assign a dataclass that has default DCB parameters, with both making decisions based on the data set name.

When SMS is active, several new parameters are available in dynamic allocation and the DD JCL statement, e.g., DSNTYPE.

==== The Binder ====
The Binder is a program similar to the linkage editor that can also manage program objects on a PDSE library.

==== Remote copy and mirroring ====
DFSMSdfp provides facilities for using several different protocols to duplicate or mirror DASD volumes to a remote location.

==== OAM ====
Object Access Method (OAM) maintains a library of unstructured objects. Such objects are sometimes referred to as BLOBs.

=== DFSORT ===
DFSORT is a sort/merge utility that is part of the DFSMS family but not part of the DFSMS/MVS product.

=== DFSMShsm ===
DFSMShsm, originally Hierarchical Storage Manager (HSM), 5740-XRB, and later Data Facility Hierarchical Storage Manager Version 2 (DFHSM), 5665-329, before becoming an optional component of DFSMS, is a utility for archiving and retrieving datasets. It migrates data from faster storage to less expensive storage, either based on time stamps or explicit requests. It uses DFSMSdss as a data mover.

=== RACF ===
RACF is a security program that is part of the DFSMS family but not part of the DFSMS/MVS product. It includes an API called SAF that allows applications to do authentication and to check access privileges, and also includes an interface to LDAP.

=== DFSMSrmm ===
The Removable Media Manager (DFSMSrmm) controls libraries of tapes, whether manually mounted on tape drive or stored in an automated tape library.
