= Static library =

Software library used via static linking

A static library or statically linked library contains functions and data that can be included in a consuming computer program at build-time such that the library does not need to be accessible in a separate file at run-time. If all libraries are statically linked, then the resulting executable will be stand-alone, a.k.a. a static build.

Static libraries are collections of object files, usually augmented with a symbol table that accelerates the search for the needed file(s). On most systems (Unix-like systems and Microsoft Windows) this comes in the form of ar archive files, though on some systems such as z/OS and OpenVMS a different format is used. (Note: A static library on z/OS may be a partitioned data set (PDS) containg object decks, a PDS containing load modules or a Partitioned Data Set Extended (PDSE or PDS/E) containing program objects. (DFSMS introduced PDS/E; the other two formats are inherited from OS/360.) z/OS programs built for the UNIX System Services (USS) environment use ar.) A static library is either merged with other static libraries and object files at build-time to form a single executable or loaded at run-time into the address space of their corresponding executable at a static memory offset determined at compile-time/link-time.

== Comparison to dynamic linking ==
Historically, all library linking was static, but today dynamic linking is an alternative and entails inherent trade-offs.

An advantage of static over dynamic is that the application is guaranteed to have the library routines it requires available at run-time, as the code to those routines is embedded in the executable file. With dynamic linking, not only might the library file be missing, but even if found, it could be an incompatible version. Static avoids DLL Hell or more generally dependency hell and therefore can simplify development, distribution and installation.

With static linking, a smart linker only includes the code that is actually used, but for a dynamic library, the entire library is loaded into the address space, which means that code that is not used by the program may be loaded into memory. However, if more than one program is using that code, only one copy of the shared code is loaded into memory.

The size of an executable is larger with static linking than dynamic, as the statically-linked executable includes copies of library routines used by the program. However, if the size of an application is measured as the sum of the executable and its dynamic libraries, then the overall size is generally less for static linking. But if the same dynamic library is used by multiple applications, then the overall size of the combined applications and the dynamic libraries might be less with dynamic linking.

A common practice on Windows is to install a program's dynamic libraries with the program file. On Unix-like systems this is less common as package management systems can be used to ensure the correct library files are available in a shared location. Library files can be shared between applications. This can save space. The library can be updated to fix bugs and security flaws without updating each application that uses the library. But shared, dynamic libraries leads to the risk of dependency problems.

In practice, many executables use both static and dynamic libraries.

== Linking and loading ==
Any static library function can call a function or procedure in another static library. The linker and loader handle this the same way as for kinds of other object files. Static library files may be linked at run time by a linking loader (e.g., the X11 module loader). However, whether such a process can be called static linking is controversial.

== Creating static libraries in C/C++ ==
Static libraries can be easily created in C or in C++. These languages provide storage-class specifiers for indicating external or internal linkage, in addition to providing other features. To create such a library, the exported functions or procedures and other objects and variables must be specified for external linkage (i.e. by not using the C static keyword). Static library filenames usually have ".a" extension on Unix-like systems and ".lib" extension on Microsoft Windows.

For example, on a Unix-like system, to create an archive named libclass.a from files class1.o, class2.o, class3.o, the following command would be used:

ar rcs libclass.a class1.o class2.o class3.o

to compile a program that depends on class1.o, class2.o, and class3.o, one could do:

cc main.c libclass.a

or (if libclass.a is placed in the standard library path, like /usr/local/lib)

cc main.c -lclass

or (during linking)

ld ... main.o -lclass ...

instead of:

cc main.c class1.o class2.o class3.o

Both Unix and Windows static library files use the format of ar.

== See also ==
- Static build
- Library (computing)
- Linker (computing)
- Loader (computing)
- Shared library
- Dynamic-link library (DLL, .dll)
- ar (Unix)
- External variable
- Object file
- Prebinding
- JAR (file format)
