= Gold (linker) =

Linker for ELF files

gold
- Developer: Ian Lance Taylor
- Written in: C++
- Operating system: GNU
- Platform: x86, x86-64, ARM, PowerPC, TILE-Gx
- Type: Linker
- License: GNU General Public License version 3
- Website: sourceware.org/binutils/

In software engineering, gold is a linker for ELF files. It became an official GNU package and was added to binutils in March 2008 and first released in binutils version 2.19. gold was developed by Ian Lance Taylor and a small team at Google. The motivation for writing gold was to make a linker that is faster than the GNU linker, especially for large applications coded in C++.

Unlike the GNU linker, gold does not use the BFD library to process object files. While this limits the object file formats it can process to ELF only, it is also claimed to result in a cleaner and faster implementation without an additional abstraction layer. The author cited complete removal of BFD as a reason to create a new linker from scratch rather than incrementally improve the GNU linker. This rewrite also fixes some bugs in old ld that break ELF files in various minor ways.

To specify gold in a makefile, one sets the LD or LD environment variable to ld.gold. To specify gold through a compiler option, one can use the gcc option -fuse-ld=gold.

The Ubuntu package 'bintuils-gold' installs the package to the system.

Fedora has moved gold from binutils into its own package due to concerns it is suffering from bitrot after Google's interest has moved to LLVM.

On 2025-02-02 the 2.44 version of GNU Binutils removed gold from the default source distribution and into a separate package, stating that "the gold linker is now deprecated and will eventually be removed unless volunteers step forward and offer to continue development and maintenance".

== See also ==
- Comparison of executable file formats, also for PE/COFF (Windows), and Mach-O (Mac OS X) formats.
