= Dynamic linker =

Operating system feature that integrates dynamic libraries into a program at runtime

A dynamic linker is an operating system feature that loads and links dynamic libraries for an executable at runtime, before or while it is running. Although the details vary by operating system, typically, a dynamic linker copies the content of each library from persistent storage to RAM, fills jump tables and relocates pointers.

Linking is often referred to as a process that is performed when the executable is compiled, while a dynamic linker is a special part of an operating system that loads external shared libraries into a running process and then binds those shared libraries dynamically to the running process. This approach is also called late linking.

== Implementations ==
=== Microsoft Windows ===
Dynamic-link library, or DLL, is Microsoft's implementation of the shared library concept in the Microsoft Windows and OS/2 operating systems. These libraries usually have the file extension DLL, OCX (for libraries containing ActiveX controls), or DRV (for legacy system drivers). The file formats for DLLs are the same as for Windows EXE files – that is, Portable Executable (PE) for 32-bit and 64-bit Windows, and New Executable (NE) for 16-bit Windows. As with EXEs, DLLs can contain code, data, and resources, in any combination.

Data files with the same file format as a DLL, but with different file extensions and possibly containing only resource sections, can be called resource DLLs. Examples of such DLLs include multi-language user interface libraries with extension MUI, icon libraries, sometimes having the extension ICL, and font files, having the extensions FON and FOT.

=== Unix-like systems using ELF, and Darwin-based systems ===
In most Unix-like systems, most of the machine code that makes up the dynamic linker is actually an external executable that the operating system kernel loads and executes first in a process address space newly constructed as a result of calling exec or posix_spawn functions. At link time, the path of the dynamic linker that should be used is embedded into the executable image.

When an executable file is loaded, the operating system kernel reads the path of the dynamic linker from it and then attempts to load and execute this other executable binary; if that attempt fails because, for example, there is no file with that path, the attempt to execute the original executable fails. The dynamic linker then loads the initial executable image and all the dynamically-linked libraries on which it depends and starts the executable. As a result, the pathname of the dynamic linker is part of the operating system's application binary interface.

==== Systems using ELF ====
In Unix-like systems that use ELF for executable images and dynamic libraries, such as Solaris, 64-bit versions of HP-UX, Linux, FreeBSD, NetBSD, OpenBSD, and DragonFly BSD, the path of the dynamic linker that should be used is embedded at link time into the .interp section of the executable's PT_INTERP segment. In those systems, dynamically loaded shared libraries can be identified by the filename suffix .so (shared object).

The dynamic linker can be influenced into modifying its behavior during either the program's execution or the program's linking, and the examples of this can be seen in the run-time linker manual pages for various Unix-like systems. A typical modification of this behavior is the use of LD_LIBRARY_PATH and LD_PRELOAD environment variables, which adjust the runtime linking process by searching for shared libraries at alternate locations and by forcibly loading and linking libraries that would otherwise not be, respectively. An example is zlibc, also known as uncompress.so, (Note: Not to be confused with the zlib compression library) which facilitates transparent decompression when used through the LD_PRELOAD hack; consequently, it is possible to read pre-compressed (gzipped) file data on BSD and Linux systems as if the files were not compressed, essentially allowing a user to add transparent compression to the underlying filesystem, although with some caveats. The mechanism is flexible, allowing trivial adaptation of the same code to perform additional or alternate processing of data during the file read, prior to the provision of said data to the user process that has requested it.

==== Darwin-based systems ====
In Apple's Darwin operating system, and in Apple's operating systems built on top of it, such as macOS, iOS, iPadOS, tvOS, watchOS, and visionOS, the path of the dynamic linker that should be used is embedded at link time into one of the Mach-O load commands in the executable image. In those systems, dynamically loaded shared libraries can be identified either by the filename suffix .dylib or by their placement inside the bundle for a framework.

The dynamic linker not only links the target executable to the shared libraries but also places machine code functions at specific address points in memory that the target executable knows about at link time. When an executable wishes to interact with the dynamic linker, it simply executes the machine-specific call or jump instruction to one of those well-known address points. The executables on the Darwin-based platforms often interact with the dynamic linker during the execution of the process; it is even known that an executable might interact with the dynamic linker, causing it to load more libraries and resolve more symbols, hours after it initially launches. The reason that many programs for a Darwin-based operating system interact with the dynamic linker so often is due both to Apple's Cocoa and Cocoa Touch APIs, used by most applications for those operating systems, and Objective-C, the language in which those APIs are implemented (see their main articles for more information).

The dynamic linker can be coerced into modifying some of its behavior; however, unlike other Unix-like operating systems, these modifications are hints that can be (and sometimes are) ignored by the dynamic linker. Examples of this can be seen in dyld's manual page. A typical modification of this behavior is the use of the DYLD_FRAMEWORK_PATH and DYLD_PRINT_LIBRARIES environment variables. The former of the previously mentioned variables adjusts the executables' search path for the shared libraries, while the latter displays the names of the libraries as they are loaded and linked.

Apple's macOS dynamic linker is an open-source project released as part of Darwin and can be found in the Apple's open-source dyld project.

=== XCOFF-based Unix-like systems ===
In Unix-like operating systems using XCOFF, such as AIX, dynamically-loaded shared libraries use the filename suffix .a.

The dynamic linker can be influenced into modifying its behavior during either the program's execution or the program's linking. A typical modification of this behavior is the use of the LIBPATH environment variable. This variable adjusts the runtime linking process by searching for shared libraries at alternate locations and by forcibly loading and linking libraries that would otherwise not be, respectively.

=== OS/360 and successors ===
Dynamic linking from Assembler language programs in IBM OS/360 and its successors is done typically using a LINK macro instruction containing a Supervisor Call instruction that activates the operating system routines that makes the library module to be linked available to the program. Library modules may reside in a "STEPLIB" or "JOBLIB" specified in control cards and only available to a specific execution of the program, in a library included in the LINKLIST in the PARMLIB (specified at system startup time), or in the "link pack area" where specific reentrant modules are loaded at system startup time.

=== Multics ===
In the Multics operating system all files, including executables, are segments. A call to a routine not part of the current segment will cause the system to find the referenced segment, in memory or on disk, and add it to the address space of the running process. Dynamic linking is the normal method of operation, and static linking (using the binder) is the exception.

== Efficiency ==
Dynamic linking is generally slower (requires more CPU cycles) than linking during compilation time, as is the case for most processes executed at runtime. However, loading time can be reduced by using "lazy linking", a process in which calls to functions of a library are linked to the implementation (inside the library) only when the first call occurs; a side effect is that, once the program is loaded, the first call to a function would be slower, as the time to link to it was shifted from startup time to run time.

However, dynamic linking is often more space-efficient (on disk and in memory at runtime). When a library is linked statically, every process being run is linked with its own copy of the library functions being called upon. Therefore, if a library is called upon many times by different programs, the same functions in that library are duplicated in several places in the system's memory. Using shared, dynamic libraries means that, instead of linking each file to its own copy of a library at compilation time and potentially wasting memory space, only one copy of the library is ever stored in memory at a time, freeing up memory space to be used elsewhere. Additionally, in dynamic linking, a library is only loaded if it is actually being used.

== See also ==
- Direct binding
- DLL Hell
- Dynamic loading
- Late binding
- prelink
- Dynamic dead-code elimination
