= Relocation (computing) =

Assigning or adjusting addresses at runtime

In software development, relocation is the process of assigning load addresses for position-dependent code and data of a program and adjusting the code and data to reflect the assigned addresses.

A linker usually performs relocation in conjunction with symbol resolution, the process of searching files and libraries to replace symbolic references or names of libraries with actual usable addresses in memory before running a program.

Relocation is typically done by the linker at link time, but it can also be done at load time by a relocating loader, or at run time by the running program itself.

== Segmentation ==
Object files are typically segmented into various memory segments or section types. Example segment types include code segment (.text), initialized data segment (.data), uninitialized data segment (.bss), or others as established by the programmer, such as common segments or named static segments.

== Relocation table ==
The relocation table is a list of addresses created by a compiler or assembler and stored in the object or executable file. Each entry in the table references an absolute address in the object code that must be changed when the loader relocates the program so that it will refer to the correct location. Entries in the relocation table are known as fixups and are designed to support relocation of the program as a complete unit. In some cases, each fixup in the table is itself relative to a base address of zero, so the fixups themselves must be changed as the loader moves through the table.

In some architectures, a fixup that crosses certain boundaries (such as a segment boundary) or that is not aligned on a word boundary is illegal and flagged as an error by the linker.

=== DOS and 16-bit Windows ===
Far pointers (32-bit pointers with segment:offset, used to address 20-bit 640 KB memory space available to DOS programs), which point to code or data within a DOS executable (EXE), do not have absolute segments, because the actual address of code or data depends on where the program is loaded in memory and this is not known until the program is loaded.

Instead, segments are relative values in the DOS EXE file. These segments need to be corrected when the executable has been loaded into memory. The EXE loader uses a relocation table to find the segments that need to be adjusted.

=== Windows ===
With 32-bit Windows operating systems, it is not mandatory to provide relocation tables for EXE files, since they are the first image loaded into the virtual address space and thus will be loaded at their preferred base address.

For both DLLs and for EXEs which opt into address space layout randomization (ASLR), an exploit mitigation technique introduced with Windows Vista, relocation tables once again become mandatory because of the possibility that the binary may be dynamically moved before being executed, even though they are still the first thing loaded in the virtual address space.

Windows executables can be marked as ASLR-compatible. The ability exists in Windows 8 and newer to enable ASLR even for applications not marked as compatible. To run successfully in this environment, the relocation sections cannot be omitted by the compiler.

=== Unix-like systems ===
The Executable and Linkable Format (ELF) executable and shared library format used by most Unix-like systems allows several types of relocation to be defined.

Akin to the situation on Windows, libraries must be relocatable (contain position-independent code and accompanying tables) while executables are optionally made relocatable for ASLR. Relocatable executables are also known as position-independent executables.

== Relocation procedure ==
The linker reads segment information and relocation tables in the object files and performs relocation by:

- Merging all segments of common type into a single segment of that type
- Assigning non-overlapping run-time addresses to each segment and each symbol, assigning all code (functions) and data (global variables) unique run-time addresses
- Referring to the relocation table to modify symbol references in data and object code so that they point to the assigned run-time addresses.

== Example ==
The following example uses Donald Knuth's MIX architecture and MIXAL assembly language. The principles are the same for any architecture, though the details will change.

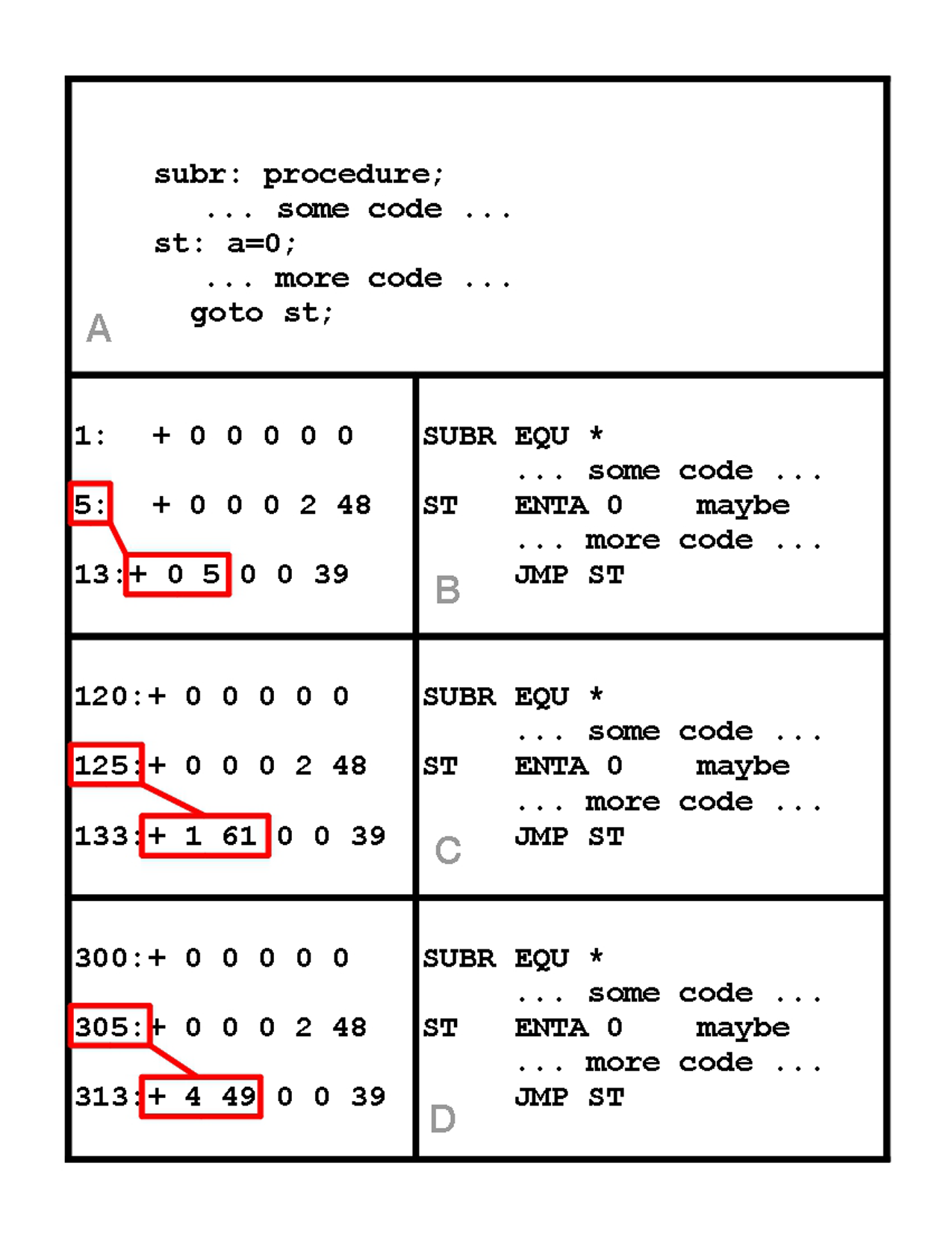

- (A) Program SUBR is compiled to produce object file (B), shown as both machine code and assembly. The compiler may designate the start of the compiled code at an arbitrary location, often location 1, as shown. Location 13 contains the machine code for the jump instruction to statement ST in location 5.
- (C) If SUBR is later linked with other code, it may be stored at a location other than 1. In this example, the linker places it at location 120. The address in the jump instruction, which is now at location 133, must be relocated to point to the new location of the code for statement ST, now 125. [1 61 shown in the instruction is the MIX machine code representation of 125].
- (D) When the program is loaded into memory to run, it may be loaded at some location other than the one assigned by the linker. This example shows SUBR now at location 300. The address in the jump instruction, now at 313, needs to be relocated again so that it points to the updated location of ST, 305. [4 49 is the MIX machine representation of 305].

== Alternatives ==
Some architectures avoid relocation entirely by deferring address assignment to run time, as, for example, in stack machines with zero address arithmetic or in some segmented architectures where every compilation unit is loaded into a separate segment.

== See also ==
- Garbage collection
- Pointer swizzling, a lazy form of pointer modification
- Prebinding
- Rebasing
- Relocatable Object Module Format
- Static library
