= Language-independent =

Language-independent may refer to:

- Language-independent specification, a programming language specification applicable toward arbitrary language bindings
- Language independent arithmetic, a series of ISO/IEC standards on computer arithmetic
- Language independent data types, a collection of datatypes defined independently of programming language

== See also ==
- Language-agnostic, development paradigm where an appropriate language is chosen for a particular task
