= Language-agnostic =

Software paradigm independent of language

Language-agnostic programming or scripting (also called language-neutral, language-independent, or cross-language) is a software paradigm in which no particular language is promoted.

In introductory instruction, the term refers to teaching principles rather than language features. For example, a textbook such as Structure and Interpretation of Computer Programs is really a language-agnostic book about programming, and is not about programming in Scheme, per se.

As a development methodology, the concept suggests that a particular language should be chosen because of its appropriateness for a particular task (taking into consideration all factors, including ecosystem, developer skill-sets, performance, etc.), and not purely because of the skill-set available within a development team. For example, a language agnostic Java development team might choose to use Ruby or Perl for some development work, where Ruby or Perl would be more appropriate than Java.

"Cross-language" in programming and scripting describes a program in which two or more languages are used to good effect within a program's code, with each contributing its distinctive benefits.

== Related terms ==
- Language-independent specification
- Cross-language information retrieval, refers to natural languages, not programming languages
- Language independent datatypes

== See also ==
- Bilingual (disambiguation)
- Language-independent (disambiguation)
- Glue language
- Language binding
- Middleware
- Polyglot (computing)
