= Visual Eiffel =

Visual Eiffel is an implementation of the Eiffel programming language developed and distributed by Object Tools GmbH, a German company.

Visual Eiffel provides an integrated development environment running on Microsoft Windows. A major design goal was to provide an environment that, unlike EiffelStudio, does not use an original user interface paradigm but instead is comfortable to programmers familiar with such tools as Microsoft's Visual Studio and Borland's Delphi.

Visual Eiffel includes a "Display Machine" for developing GUI applications.

While many other Eiffel compilers generate C, Java bytecode or bytecode for .NET Framework, the Visual Eiffel compiler generates native X86 code.

As of the 10th of April 2005, the compiler (not the graphical environment) was, besides Windows, also available on Linux.

Licensing was free for personal use (with banner) or commercial, with the core GPL.
