= Static discipline =

Principle of circuitry

In a digital circuit or system, static discipline is a guarantee on logical elements that "if inputs meet valid input thresholds, then the system guarantees outputs will meet valid output thresholds", named by Stephen A. Ward and Robert H. Halstead in 1990, but practiced for decades earlier.

The valid output thresholds voltages V_{OH} (output high) and V_{OL} (output low), and valid input thresholds V_{IH} (input high) and V_{IL} (input low), satisfy a robustness principle such that

V_{OL} < V_{IL} < V_{IH} < V_{OH}

with sufficient noise margins in the inequalities.
