= LibertyEiffel =

Liberty Eiffel
- Developer(s): The Liberty Eiffel Team
- Stable release: Bell (2016.05, named after Alexander Graham Bell) / May 26, 2016; 8 years ago
- Repository: git.savannah.gnu.org/cgit/liberty-eiffel.git/
- Operating system: Cross-platform
- Type: compiler
- License: GPL
- Website: www.liberty-eiffel.org

Liberty Eiffel is the free GNU Eiffel compiler. The compiler translates Eiffel code to C. Hence it can be used to write programs that run on virtually any platform for which an ANSI C compiler exists. Liberty Eiffel uses type inference to make it possible to implement a more efficient compiler.

Liberty Eiffel depends on the work of the legacy SmartEiffel compiler, which was considered complete by 2007, forking their code base in 2005 to continue its development towards the disputed ECMA TC39-TG4 (now TC49-TG4) standard for the language.

== History ==
Liberty Eiffel started as an Open Source version of Eiffel, first named SmallEiffel in 1994, then named SmartEiffel. In June 2013, the forked project Liberty Eiffel became the official GNU compiler for the Eiffel programming language.
