= Business Object Notation =

In software engineering, Business Object Notation (BON) is a method and graphical notation for high-level object-oriented analysis and design.

The method was developed between 1989 and 1993 by Jean-Marc Nerson and Kim Waldén as a means of extending the higher-level concepts of the Eiffel programming language. It is simpler than its competing modeling notation - the Unified Modeling Language (UML) - but it didn't enjoy its commercial success.

== See also ==
- Business object
