= F2c =

f2c
- Developer: Bell Laboratories
- Website: www.netlib.org/f2c/
- Repository: www.netlib.org/f2c/

f2c is a program to convert Fortran 77 to C code, developed at Bell Laboratories. The standalone f2c program was based on the core of the first complete Fortran 77 compiler to be implemented, the "f77" program by Feldman and Weinberger. Because the f77 compiler was itself written in C and relied on a C compiler back end to complete its final compilation step, it and its derivatives like f2c were much more portable than compilers generating machine code directly.

== History ==
The f2c program was released as free software and subsequently became one of the most common means to compile Fortran code on many systems where native Fortran compilers were unavailable or expensive. Several large Fortran libraries, such as LAPACK, were made available as C libraries via conversion with f2c. The f2c program also influenced the development of the GNU g77 compiler, which uses a modified version of the f2c runtime libraries.
