= Language-independent specification =

Computer programming standard meant to be interoperable across programming languages

A language-independent specification (LIS) is a programming language specification providing a common interface usable for defining semantics applicable toward arbitrary language bindings.

LIS's are language-agnostic; they mitigate the risk that a certain language binding might reduce compatibility with other languages. An ideal LIS allows the language bindings to take advantage of features of a programming language uncompromisingly.

Examples of LIS include Interface description language (IDL), Simplified Wrapper and Interface Generator (SWIG) and Common Language Infrastructure (CLI).

Recursive transcompiling can be used to distribute a language independent specification across many different technologies, with each technology potentially keeping an authoritative description of a different part of the specification. Recursive transcompiling provides the general methodology for distributing this authoritative information through the rest of the derivative code pipeline.

== See also ==
- Derivative code
- ISO/IEC 10967
- ISO/IEC 11404
- Language interoperability
- Pivot language
- Recursive transcompiling
- Specification language
- Transcompiler
