= ISO/IEC 11404 =

Collection of datatypes

ISO/IEC 11404, General Purpose Datatypes (GPD), are a collection of datatypes defined independently of any particular programming language or implementation. These datatypes can be used to describe interfaces to existing libraries without having to specify the language (such as Fortran or C).

The first edition of this standard was published in 1996 under the title "Language-independent datatypes". The standard was revised by the responsible ISO sub-committee (JTC1/SC22 - Information Technology - Programming languages). The revised version has the new title "General Purpose Datatypes".
