= Bertrand Meyer =

French computer scientist

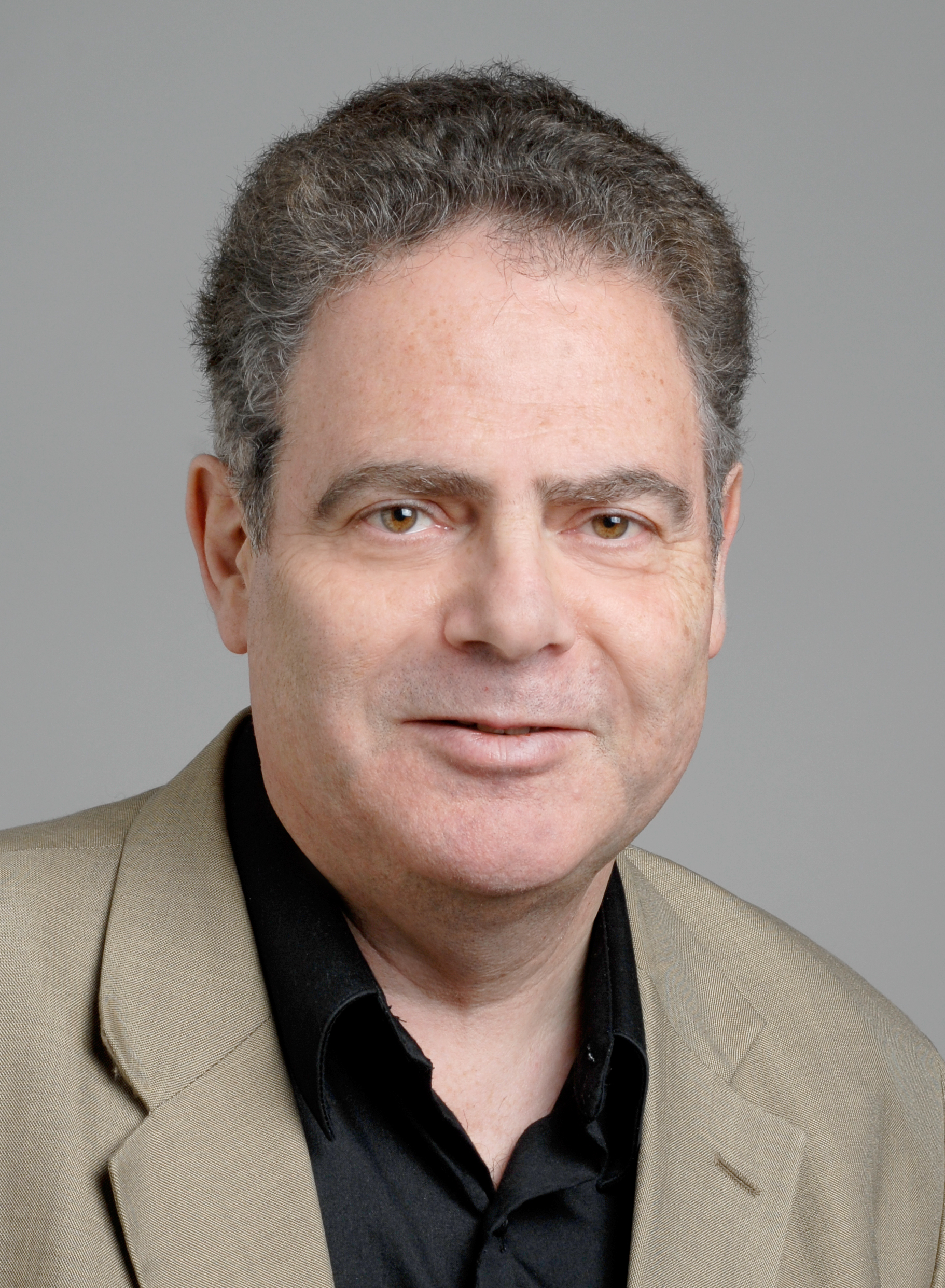
- Meyer in 2013
- Education: Université de Nancy; Stanford University; École Polytechnique
- Occupation: Professor
- Employer: ETH Zurich
- Known for: Eiffel, design by contract
- Website: bertrandmeyer.com

Bertrand Meyer (/ˈmaɪ.ər/; French: [mɛjɛʁ]) is a French academic, author, and consultant in the field of programming languages. He created the Eiffel language and the concept of design by contract.

Meyer is known for his books on programming languages and object-oriented programming, as well as his contributions to the Z notation specification and design of the Eiffel programming language.

== Awards ==
Meyer is a member of Academia Europaea and the French Academy of Technologies and a Fellow of the ACM. He has received honorary doctorates from ITMO University in Saint Petersburg, Russia (2004) (returned in 2022) and the University of York, England (2015).

He was the first "senior award" winner of the AITO Dahl-Nygaard award in 2005. This prize, named after the two founders of object-oriented programming, is awarded annually to a senior and a junior researcher who has made significant technical contributions to the field of OOP.

He is the 2009 recipient of the IEEE Computer Society Harlan Mills award "for practical & fundamental contributions to object-oriented software engineering".

He is an IFIP fellow, as part of the first group to receive this distinction in 2019, and received in 2017 the ACM SIGSOFT Software Engineering Educator Award. He was the recipient of an ERC (European Research Council) Advanced Investigator Grant (2012-2017).

In 2006, Meyer received the ACM Software System Award for "impact on software quality" in recognition of the design of Eiffel.

== Wikipedia hoax ==
On 28 December 2005, an anonymous user falsely announced Meyer's death on the German Wikipedia's biography of Meyer. The hoax was reported five days later by the Heise News Ticker and the article was immediately corrected. Many major news media outlets in Germany and Switzerland picked up the story. Meyer went on to publish a positive evaluation of Wikipedia, concluding "The system succumbed to one of its potential flaws, and quickly healed itself. This doesn't affect the big picture. Just like those about me, rumors about Wikipedia's downfall have been grossly exaggerated."

== Published works ==
- Meyer, Bertrand (1997). Object-Oriented Software Construction (2nd ed.). Prentice Hall. ISBN 0-13-629155-4.
- Meyer, Bertrand (1992). Eiffel: The Language. Prentice Hall. ISBN 0-13-247925-7.
- Meyer, Bertrand (1994). Reusable Software: The Base Object-Oriented Component Libraries. Prentice Hall. ISBN 0-13-245499-8.
- Meyer, Bertrand (1995). Object Success: A Manager's Guide to Object-Oriented Technology. Prentice Hall. ISBN 0-13-192833-3.
- Meyer, Bertrand (1990). Introduction to the Theory of Programming Languages. Prentice Hall. ISBN 978-0134935119.
- Meyer, Bertrand (2009). Touch of Class: Learning to Program Well with Objects and Contracts. Springer. ISBN 978-3540921448.
- Meyer, Bertrand (2014). Agile! The Good, the Hype and the Ugly. Springer. ISBN 978-3319051543.
- Meyer, Bertrand (2022). Handbook of Requirements and Business Analysis. Springer. ISBN 978-3030876197.
- Meyer, Bertrand, ed. (2024). The French School of Programming. Springer. ISBN 978-3031345173.

== See also ==
- Open–closed principle
- Uniform access principle
