= Delegation (disambiguation) =

Delegation is the assignment of any responsibility or authority to another person.

Delegation may also refer to:

== Computing ==
- Delegation (computing), passing of something from one entity to another
- Delegation (computer security), handing a user's authentication credentials to another user
- Delegation (object-oriented programming), evaluating a member of one object in the context of another

== Media ==
- Delegation (band), a British soul musical group 1975–1999
- The Delegation, a 2018 Albanian film

== Other ==
- Delegation (law), in contract law, the act of giving another party the responsibility of carrying out agreed performance
- Delegations of Tunisia, second-level administrative subdivisions

== See also ==
- Delegate (disambiguation)
- Delegation theory
- Subsidiarity
- Subsidiarity (European Union)
- Subsidiarity (Catholicism)
- Devolution
- Municipalities of Mexico City, or delegaciones
