= Delegate =

Delegate or delegates may refer to:

- Delegate, New South Wales, a town in Australia
- Delegate (CLI), a computer programming technique
- Delegate (American politics), a representative in any of various political organizations
- Delegate (United States Congress), a non-voting member of the United States House of Representatives
- Delegate Apostolic or nuncio, an ecclesiastical diplomat representing the Holy See
- The Delegates, a 1970s novelty song group

== See also ==
- Delegation (disambiguation)
- Delegate model of representation
