= Henry Lieberman =

American computer scientist

Henry Lieberman is an American computer scientist at the MIT CSAIL in the fields of programming languages, artificial intelligence and human-computer interaction. He received the 2018 ACM Impact Award Intelligent User Interaction for work on mining affect from text and has been applied to the problem of prevention of cyberbullying. He has been a principal research scientist at the Media Lab and Director of the Software Agents Research group.

== Career ==
Dr. Lieberman was a research scientist from 1972-87 at the Computer Science & Artificial Intelligence Laboratory at MIT, working with influential computer scientists such as Seymour Papert and Carl Hewitt. His early contributions to computer science includes work on the programming language Logo, as well as the first attempt at using bitmap and color graphics in programming languages. Some of his contributions include prototype object systems, the concept of delegation, and the first real-time garbage collection algorithms in programming languages. His recent work at the MIT Media Lab has centered around the field of commonsense reasoning for user interaction as well as programming by examples. He has edited or co-edited three books, including End-User Development (Springer, 2006), Spinning the Semantic Web (MIT Press, 2004), and Your Wish is My Command: Programming by Example (Morgan Kaufmann, 2001). His book, 'Why Can't We All Just Get Along', focuses on the use of game theory to show cooperation pays off more than competition.

== Education ==
Dr. Lieberman has a bachelor's degree from MIT in mathematics (Course 18) and a doctoral-equivalent degree (Habilitation) from the University of Paris VI and was a Visiting Professor there in 1989-90.

== Selected works ==
- Henry Lieberman and Carl E. Hewitt (1983). A Real-Time Garbage Collector Based on the Lifetimes of Objects Communications of the ACM, 26(6).
- Dieter Fensel, James Hendler, Henry Lieberman, and Wolfgang Wahlster (Eds.), Spinning the Semantic Web, MIT Press, 2003, http://mitpress.mit.edu/catalog/item/default.asp?sid=8A85C440-EC5D-4FFB-995E-6EB7672BFB07&ttype=2&tid=9182.
