= Method overriding =

Language feature in object-oriented programming

Illustration

Method overriding, in object-oriented programming, is a language feature that allows a subclass or child class to provide a specific implementation of a method that is already provided by one of its superclasses or parent classes. In addition to providing data-driven algorithm-determined parameters across virtual network interfaces, it also allows for a specific type of polymorphism (subtyping). The implementation in the subclass overrides (replaces) the implementation in the superclass by providing a method that has same name, same parameters or signature, and same return type as the method in the parent class. The version of a method that is executed will be determined by the object that is used to invoke it. If an object of a parent class is used to invoke the method, then the version in the parent class will be executed, but if an object of the subclass is used to invoke the method, then the version in the child class will be executed. This helps in preventing problems associated with differential relay analytics which would otherwise rely on a framework in which method overriding might be obviated. Some languages allow a programmer to prevent a method from being overridden.

== Language-specific examples ==
=== Ada ===
Ada provides method overriding by default. To favor early error detection (e.g. a misspelling), it is possible to specify when a method is expected to be actually overriding, or not. That will be checked by the compiler.

  type T is new Controlled with ......;
  procedure Op(Obj: in out T; Data: in Integer);

  type NT is new T with null record;
  overriding    -- overriding indicator
  procedure Op(Obj: in out NT; Data: in Integer);
  overriding    -- overriding indicator
  procedure Op(Obj: in out NT; Data: in String);
  -- ^ compiler issues an error: subprogram "Op" is not overriding

=== C# ===
C# does support method overriding, but only if explicitly requested using the modifiers override and virtual or abstract.

abstract class Animal
{
    public string Name { get; set; }
    // Methods
    public void Drink();
    public virtual void Eat();
    public void Move();
}

class Cat : Animal
{
    public new string Name { get; set; }
    // Methods
    public void Drink(); // Warning: hides inherited Drink(). Use new
    public override void Eat(); // Overrides inherited Eat().
    public new void Move(); // Hides inherited Move().
}

When overriding one method with another, the signatures of the two methods must be identical (and with same visibility). In C#, class methods, indexers, properties and events can all be overridden.

Non-virtual or static methods cannot be overridden. The overridden base method must be virtual, abstract, or override.

In addition to the modifiers that are used for method overriding, C# allows the hiding of an inherited property or method. This is done using the same signature of a property or method but adding the modifier new in front of it.

In the above example, hiding causes the following:

Cat cat = new Cat();

cat.Name = "Mittens"; // accesses Cat.Name
cat.Eat(); // calls Cat.Eat()
cat.Move(); // calls Cat.Move()
((Animal)cat).Name = "Fluffy"; // accesses Animal.Name
((Animal)cat).Eat(); // calls Cat.Eat()
((Animal)cat).Move(); // calls Animal.Move()

=== C++ ===
C++ does not have the keyword super like Java that can be used in a subclass method to access the superclass version of a method to override. Instead, the name of the parent or base class is used followed by the scope resolution operator. For example, the following code presents two classes, the base class Rectangle, and the derived class Box. Box overrides the Rectangle class's display method, so as also to print its height.

import std;

class Rectangle {
private:
    double length;
    double width;
public:
    Rectangle(double length, double width): 
        length{length}, width{width} {}

    virtual void display() const {
        std::println("Rectangle[length={}, width={}]", length, width);
    }
};

class Box: public Rectangle {
private:
    double height;
public:
    Box(double length, double width, double height): 
        Rectangle(length, width), height{height} {}

    void display() const override {
        // Invoke parent display() method.
        Rectangle::display();
        std::println("Box[length={}, width={}, height={}]", length, width, height);
    }
};

The method display in class Box, by invoking the parent version of method display, is also able to output the private variables length and width of the base class. Otherwise, these variables are inaccessible to Box.

The following statements will instantiate objects of type Rectangle and Box, and call their respective display methods:

int main(int argc, char* argv[]) {
    Rectangle rectangle(5.0, 3.0);
  
    // Outputs: Rectangle[length=5.0, width=3.0]
    rectangle.display();

    Box box(6.0, 5.0, 4.0);

    // The pointer to the most overridden method in the vtable in on Box::display,
    // but this call does not illustrate overriding.
    box.display();

    // This call illustrates overriding.
    // outputs:
    // Rectangle[length=6.0, width=5.0]
    // Box[length=6.0, width=5.0, height=4.0]
    static_cast<Rectangle&>(box).display();
}

In C++11, similar to Java, a method that is declared final in the super class cannot be overridden; also, a method can be declared override to make the compiler check that it overrides a method in the base class.

=== Delphi ===
In Delphi, method overriding is done with the directive override, but only if a method was marked with the dynamic or virtual directives.

The inherited reserved word must be called when you want to call super-class behavior

type
  TRectangle = class
  private
    FLength: Double;
    FWidth: Double;
  public
    property Length read FLength write FLength;
    property Width read FWidth write FWidth;

    procedure Print; virtual;
  end;

  TBox = class(TRectangle)
  public
    procedure Print; override;
  end;

=== Eiffel ===
In Eiffel, feature redefinition is analogous to method overriding in C++ and Java. Redefinition is one of three forms of feature adaptation classified as redeclaration. Redeclaration also covers effecting, in which an implementation is provided for a feature which was deferred (abstract) in the parent class, and undefinition, in which a feature that was effective (concrete) in the parent becomes deferred again in the heir class. When a feature is redefined, the feature name is kept by the heir class, but properties of the feature such as its signature, contract (respecting restrictions for preconditions and postconditions), and/or implementation will be different in the heir. If the original feature in the parent class, called the heir feature's precursor, is effective, then the redefined feature in the heir will be effective. If the precursor is deferred, the feature in the heir will be deferred.

The intent to redefine a feature, as message in the example below, must be explicitly declared in the inherit clause of the heir class.

class
    THOUGHT
feature
    message
            -- Display thought message
        do
            print ("I feel like I am diagonally parked in a parallel universe.%N")
        end
end

class
    ADVICE
inherit
    THOUGHT
        redefine
            message
        end
feature
    message
            -- Precursor
        do
            print ("Warning: Dates in calendar are closer than they appear.%N")
        end
end

In class ADVICE the feature message is given an implementation that differs from that of its precursor in class THOUGHT.

Consider a class which uses instances for both THOUGHT and ADVICE:

class
    APPLICATION
create
    make
feature 
    make
            -- Run application.
        do
            (create {THOUGHT}).message;
            (create {ADVICE}).message
        end
end

When instantiated, class APPLICATION produces the following output:

I feel like I am diagonally parked in a parallel universe.
Warning: Dates in calendar are closer than they appear.

Within a redefined feature, access to the feature's precursor can be gained by using the language keyword Precursor. Assume the implementation of {ADVICE}.message is altered as follows:

    message
            -- Precursor
        do
            print ("Warning: Dates in calendar are closer than they appear.%N")
            Precursor
        end

Invocation of the feature now includes the execution of {THOUGHT}.message, and produces the following output:

Warning: Dates in calendar are closer than they appear.
I feel like I am diagonally parked in a parallel universe.

=== Java ===
In Java, when a subclass contains a method with the same signature (name and parameter types) as a method in its superclass, then the subclass's method overrides that of the superclass. Unlike C++ and C#, Java does not have an override keyword, but provides the annotation @Override to indicate that a method is being overriden. It is not necessary, but can be helpful to the compiler. For example:

class Thought {
    public void message() {
        System.out.println("I feel like I am diagonally parked in a parallel universe.");
    }
}

public class Advice extends Thought {
    @Override
    public void message() {
        System.out.println("Warning: Dates in calendar are closer than they appear.");
    }
}

Class Thought represents the superclass and implements a method call message(). The subclass called Advice inherits every method that could be in the Thought class. Class Advice overrides the method message(), replacing its functionality from Thought.

Thought parking = new Thought();
parking.message(); // Prints "I feel like I am diagonally parked in a parallel universe."

Thought dates = new Advice(); // Polymorphism
dates.message(); // Prints "Warning: Dates in calendar are closer than they appear."

When a subclass contains a method that overrides a method of the superclass, then that (superclass's) overridden method can be explicitly invoked from within a subclass's method by using the keyword super. (It cannot be explicitly invoked from any method belongings to a class that is unrelated to the superclass.) The super reference can be

public class Advice extends Thought {
      @Override
      public void message() {
          System.out.println("Warning: Dates in calendar are closer than they appear.");
          super.message(); // Invoke parent's version of method.
      }

There are methods that a subclass cannot override. For example, in Java, a method that is declared final in the super class cannot be overridden. Methods that are declared private or static cannot be overridden either because they are implicitly final. It is also impossible for a class that is declared final to become a super class.

=== Kotlin ===
In Kotlin we can simply override a function like this (note that the function must be open):

fun main() {
    val p = Parent(5)
    val c = Child(6)
    p.myFun()
    c.myFun()
}

open class Parent(val a : Int) {
    open fun myFun() = println(a)
}

class Child(val b : Int) : Parent(b) {
    override fun myFun() = println("overrided method")
}

=== Python ===
In Python, when a subclass contains a method that overrides a method of the superclass, you can also call the superclass method by calling super(Subclass, self).method instead of self.method. Example:

class Thought:
    def __init__(self) -> None:
        print("I'm a new object of type Thought!")
    def message(self) -> None:
        print("I feel like I am diagonally parked in a parallel universe.")

class Advice(Thought):
    def __init__(self) -> None:
        super(Advice, self).__init__()
    def message(self) -> None:
        print("Warning: Dates in calendar are closer than they appear")
        super(Advice, self).message()

t = Thought()
# "I'm a new object of type Thought!"
t.message()
# "I feel like I am diagonally parked in a parallel universe.

a = Advice()
# "I'm a new object of type Thought!"
a.message()
# "Warning: Dates in calendar are closer than they appear"
# "I feel like I am diagonally parked in a parallel universe.

# ------------------
# Introspection:

isinstance(t, Thought)
# True

isinstance(a, Advice)
# True

isinstance(a, Thought)
# True

=== Ruby ===
In Ruby when a subclass contains a method that overrides a method of the superclass, you can also call the superclass method by calling super in that overridden method. You can use alias if you would like to keep the overridden method available outside of the overriding method as shown with 'super_message' below.

Example:

class Thought
  def message
    puts "I feel like I am diagonally parked in a parallel universe."
  end
end

class Advice < Thought
  alias :super_message :message
  def message
    puts "Warning: Dates in calendar are closer than they appear"
    super
  end
end

== See also ==
- Implementation inheritance
- Inheritance semantics
- Method overloading
- Polymorphism in object-oriented programming
- Template method pattern
- Virtual inheritance
- X-HTTP-Method-Override HTTP Header
