= This (computer programming) =

In programming languages, the object or class the currently running code belongs to

this, self, and Me are keywords used in some computer programming languages to refer to the object, class, or other entity which the currently running code is a part of. The entity referred to thus depends on the execution context (such as which object has its method called). Different programming languages use these keywords in slightly different ways. In languages where a keyword like this is mandatory, the keyword is the only way to access data and methods stored in the current object. Where optional, these keywords can disambiguate variables and functions with the same name.

== Object-oriented programming ==
In many object-oriented programming languages, this (also called self or Me) is a variable that is used in instance methods to refer to the object on which they are working. The first OO language, SIMULA 67, used this to explicitly reference the local object. C++ and languages which derive in style from it (such as Java, C#, D, and PHP) also generally use this. Smalltalk and others, such as Object Pascal, Perl, Python, Ruby, Rust, Objective-C, DataFlex and Swift, use self. Microsoft's Visual Basic uses Me.

The concept is similar in all languages: this is usually an immutable reference or pointer which refers to the current object; the current object often being the code that acts as 'parent' or 'invocant' to the property, method, sub-routine or function that contains the this keyword. After an object is properly constructed, or instantiated, this is always a valid reference. Some languages require it explicitly; others use lexical scoping to use it implicitly to make symbols within their class visible. Or alternatively, the current object referred to by this may be an independent code object that has called the function or method containing the keyword this. Such a thing happens, for example, when a JavaScript event handler attached to an HTML tag in a web page calls a function containing the keyword this stored in the global space outside the document object; in that context, this will refer to the page element within the document object, not the enclosing window object.

In some languages, for example C++, Java, and Raku this or self is a keyword, and the variable automatically exists in instance methods. In others, for example, Python, Rust, and Perl 5, the first parameter of an instance method is such a reference. It needs to be specified explicitly. In Python and Perl, the parameter need not necessarily be named this or self; it can be named freely by the programmer like any other parameter. However, by informal convention, the first parameter of an instance method in Perl or Python is named self. Rust requires the self object to be called &self or self, depending on whether the invoked function borrows the invocant, or moves it in, respectively.

Static methods in C++ or Java are not associated with instances but classes, and so cannot use this, because there is no object. In other languages, such as Ruby, Smalltalk, Objective-C, or Swift, the method is associated with a class object that is passed as this, and they are called class methods. For class methods, Python uses cls to access to the class object.

== Subtleties and difficulties ==
When lexical scoping is used to infer this, the use of this in code, while not illegal, may raise warning bells to a maintenance programmer, although there are still legitimate uses of this in this case, such as referring to instance variables hidden by local variables of the same name, or if the method wants to return a reference to the current object, i.e. this, itself.

In some compilers (for example GCC), pointers to C++ instance methods can be directly cast to a pointer of another type, with an explicit this pointer parameter.

=== Open recursion ===
The dispatch semantics of this, namely that method calls on this are dynamically dispatched, is known as open recursion, and means that these methods can be overridden by derived classes or objects. By contrast, direct named recursion or anonymous recursion of a function uses closed recursion, with static dispatch. For example, in the following Perl code for the factorial, the token __SUB__ is a reference to the current function:

use feature ":5.16";
sub {
    my $x = shift;
    $x == 0 ? 1 : $x * __SUB__->( $x - 1 );
}

By contrast, in C++ (using an explicit this for clarity, though not necessary) the this binds to the object itself, but if the class method was declared virtual i.e. polymorphic in the base, it is resolved via dynamic dispatch so that derived classes can override it.

class Number {
private:
    unsigned int n;
public:
    // ...

    unsigned int factorial() {
        if (n == 0) {
            return 1;
        } else {
            return n * this->factorial(n - 1);
        }
    }
};

This example is artificial since this is direct recursion, so overriding the factorial() method would override this function; more natural examples are when a method in a derived class calls the same method in a base class, or in cases of mutual recursion.

The fragile base class problem has been blamed on open recursion, with the suggestion that invoking methods on this default to closed recursion (static dispatch) rather than open recursion (dynamic dispatch), only using open recursion when it is specifically requested; external calls (not using this) would be dynamically dispatched as usual. The way this is solved in practice in the JDK is through a certain programmer discipline; this discipline has been formalized by C. Ruby and G. T. Leavens; it consists of the following rules:

- No code invokes public methods on this.
- Code that can be reused internally (by invocation from other methods of the same class) is encapsulated in a protected or private method; if it needs to be exposed directly to the users as well, then a wrapper public method calls the internal method.
- The previous recommendation can be relaxed for pure methods.

== Implementations ==
=== C++ ===
Early versions of C++ would let the this pointer be changed; by doing so a programmer could change which object a method was working on. This feature was eventually removed, and now this in C++ is an r-value.

In the C++ language, the type of this for a class X is X* const; if the member function is const-qualified, the type is const X* const.

import std;

using std::string;

class Player {
private:
    string name;
    int score;
public:
    explicit Player(string name):
        name{name}, score{0} {
        // here, 'this' has type 'Player* const'
        std::println("Created new Player with name {}", this->name);
    }
   
    string toString() const {
        // here, 'this' has type 'const Player* const'
        return std::format("Player {}, with score {}", this->name, this->score);
    }
};

Early versions of C++ (i.e. C with Classes) did not include references; the creator of C++, Bjarne Stroustrup, suggested that had they been so in C++ from the beginning, this would have been a reference, not a pointer.

C++ lets objects destroy themselves with the source code statement: delete this;. However, this is valid only for objects which are heap-allocated.

import std;

class SelfDestructing {
private:
    size_t refCount = 0;

    ~SelfDestruct() {
        std::println("Running destructor");
    }
public:
    void addReference() {
        ++refCount;
    }

    void release() noexcept {
        --refCount;
        if (refCount == 0) {
            delete this; // Delete the instance
            return; // Immediately return; instance no longer valid
        }
    }
};

int main() {
    SelfDestructing* x = new SelfDestructing();
    x->addReference();

    x->release(); // prints "Running destructor"
}

==== Explicit object parameters ====
In C++23, explicit object parameters (colloquially known as "deducing this") is a feature which allows explicitly naming the implicit this parameter in a member function, allowing templates to automatically deduce the object type, qualifiers, and value category.

import std;

using std::vector;

// without deducing this:
// four different combinations of const/reference types
class Playlist {
private:
    vector<Song> songs;
public:
    // ...

    Song& operator[](size_t i) & {
        return songs[i];
    }

    const Song& operator[](size_t i) const& {
        return songs[i];
    }

    Song&& operator[](size_t i) && {
        return std::move(songs[i]);
    }

    const Song&& operator[](size_t i) const&& {
        return std::move(songs[i]);
    }
};

// with deducing this:
// overloads collapsed into a single member
class Playlist {
private:
    vector<Song> songs;
public:
    // ...

    decltype(auto) operator[](this auto&& self, size_t i) {
        return std::forward<decltype(self)>(self).songs[i];
    }
};

This has also been used to create recursive lambdas:

auto fib = [](this auto self, int n) -> int {
    if (n <= 1) {
        return n;
    }
    return self(n - 1) + self(n - 2);
}

Additionally, it can be used to simplify declarations when using the curiously recurring template pattern (CRTP).

class ChefBase {
public:
    void signatureDish(this auto&& self) {
        self.cookSignatureDish();
    }
};

class CafeChef : public ChefBase {
public:
    void cookSignatureDish() {
        // ...
    }
};

=== C# ===
The keyword this in C# works the same way as in Java, for reference types. However, within C# value types, this has quite different semantics, being similar to an ordinary mutable variable reference, and can even occur on the left side of an assignment.

One use of this in C# is to allow reference to an outer field variable within a method that contains a local variable that has the same name. In such a situation, for example, the statement string n = localAndFieldname; within the method will assign the type and value of the local variable localAndFieldname to n, whereas the statement string n = this.localAndFieldname; will assign the type and value of the outer field variable to n.

=== D ===
In D this in a class, struct, or union method refers to an immutable reference of the instance of the enclosing aggregate. Classes are reference types, and structs and unions are value types. In the first version of D, the keyword this is used as a pointer to the instance of the object the method is bound to, while in D2 it has the character of an implicit ref (call by reference) function argument.

=== Dylan ===
In the programming language Dylan, which is an object-oriented language that supports multimethods and doesn't have a concept of this, sending a message to an object is still kept in the syntax. The two forms below work in the same way; the differences are just syntactic sugar.

object.method(param1, param2)

and

method (object, param1, param2)

=== Eiffel ===
Within a class text, the current type is the type obtained from the current class. Within features (routines, commands and queries) of a class, one may use the keyword Current to reference the current class and its features. The use of the keyword Current is optional as the keyword Current is implied by simply referring to the name of the current class feature openly. For example: One might have a feature `foo' in a class MY_CLASS and refer to it by:

  class
     MY_CLASS
  
  feature -- Access
  
     foo: INTEGER
  
     my_function: INTEGER
        do
          Result := foo
       end
 
 end

Line #10 (above) has the implied reference to Current by the call to simple `foo'.

Line #10 (below) has the explicit reference to Current by the call to `Current.foo'.

  class
     MY_CLASS
  
  feature -- Access
  
     foo: INTEGER
  
     my_function: INTEGER
        do
           Result := Current.foo
       end
 
 end

Either approach is acceptable to the compiler, but the implied version (e.g. x := foo) is preferred as it is less verbose.

As with other languages, there are times when the use of the keyword Current is mandated, such as:

  class
     MY_CLASS
  
  feature -- Access
  
     my_command
           -- Create MY_OTHER_CLASS with `Current'
        local
           x: MY_OTHER_CLASS
       do
          create x.make_with_something (Current)
       end
 
 end

In the case of the code above, the call on line #11 to make_with_something is passing the current class by explicitly passing the keyword Current.

=== Java ===
The keyword this is a Java language keyword that represents the current instance of the class in which it appears. It is used to access class variables and methods.

Since all instance methods are virtual in Java, this can never be null.

=== JavaScript ===
In JavaScript, which is a programming or scripting language used extensively in web browsers, this is an important keyword, although what it evaluates to depends on where it is used.

- When used outside any function, in global space, this refers to the enclosing object, which in this case is the enclosing browser window, the window object.
- When used in a function defined in the global space, what the keyword this refers to depends on how the function is called. When such a function is called directly (e.g. f(x)), this will refer back to the global space in which the function is defined, and in which other global functions and variables may exist as well (or in strict mode, it is undefined). If a global function containing this is called as part of the event handler of an element in the document object, however, this will refer to the calling HTML element.
- When a method is called using the new keyword (e.g. let foo = new Foo()) then within Foo, this refers to the Foo object itself.
- When a function is attached as a property of an object and called as a method of that object (e.g. obj.f(x)), this will refer to the object that the function is contained within. It is even possible to manually specify this when calling a function, by using the .call() or .apply() methods of the function object. For example, the method call obj.f(x) could also be written as obj.f.call(obj, x).

To work around the different meaning of this in nested functions such as DOM event handlers, it is a common idiom in JavaScript to save the this reference of the calling object in a variable (commonly called that or self), and then use the variable to refer to the calling object in nested functions.

For example:

// In this example $ is a reference to the jQuery library 
$(".element").hover(function(): void {
    // Here, both this and that point to the element under the mouse cursor.
    let that = this;
    
    $(this).find('.elements').each(function(): void {
        // Here, this points to the DOM element being iterated.
        // However, that still points to the element under the mouse cursor.
        $(this).addClass("highlight");
    });
});

Notably, JavaScript makes use of both this and the related keyword self (in contrast to most other languages which tend to employ one or the other), with self being restricted specifically to web workers.

Finally, as a reliable way of specifically referencing the global (window or equivalent) object, JavaScript features the globalThis keyword.

=== Lua ===
In Lua, self is created as syntactic sugar when functions are defined using the : operator. When invoking a method using :, the object being indexed will be implicitly given as the first argument to the function being invoked.

For example, the following two functions are equivalent:

local obj = {}

function obj.foo(arg1, arg2)
  print(arg1, arg2) -- cannot use "self" here
end

function obj:bar(arg)
  print(self, arg) -- "self" is an implicit first argument before arg
end

-- All functions can be invoked both ways, with "." or with ":"

obj:foo("Foo") -- equivalent to obj.foo(obj, "Foo")
obj.bar(obj, "Bar") -- equivalent to obj:bar("Bar")

Lua itself is not object-oriented, but when combined with another feature called metatables, the use of self lets programmers define functions in a manner resembling object-oriented programming.

=== PowerShell ===
In PowerShell, the special automatic variable $_ contains the current object in the pipeline object. You can use this variable in commands that perform an action on every object or on selected objects in a pipeline.

"one", "two", "three" | % { write $_ }

Also starting with PowerShell 5.0, which adds a formal syntax to define classes and other user-defined types, $this variable describes the current instance of the object.

=== Python ===
In Python, there is no keyword for this. When a member function is called on an object, it invokes the member function with the same name on the object's class object, with the object automatically bound to the first argument of the function. Thus, the obligatory first parameter of instance methods serves as this; this parameter is conventionally named self, but can be named anything.

In class methods (created with the @classmethod decorator), the first argument refers to the class object itself, and is conventionally called cls; these are primarily used for inheritable constructors, where the use of the class as a parameter allows subclassing the constructor. In static methods (created with the @staticmethod decorator), no special first argument exists.

=== Rust ===
In Rust, types are declared separately from the functions associated with them. Functions designed to be analogous to instance methods in more traditionally object-oriented languages must explicitly take self as their first parameter. These functions can then be called using instance.method() syntax sugar. For example:

struct Foo {
    bar: i32,
}

impl Foo {
    fn new() -> Foo {
        Foo { bar: 0, }
    }

    fn refer(&self) {
        println!("{}", self.bar);
    }

    fn mutate(&mut self, baz: i32) {
        self.bar = baz;
    }

    fn consume(self) {
        self.refer();
    }
}

This defines a type, Foo, which has four associated functions. The first, Foo::new(), is not an instance function and must be specified with the type prefix. The remaining three all take a self parameter in a variety of ways and can be called on a Foo instance using the dot-notation syntax sugar, which is equivalent to calling the type-qualified function name with an explicit self first parameter.

let mut foo: Foo = Foo::new(); // must called as a type-specified function
foo.refer(); // prints "0". Foo::refer() has read-only access to the foo instance
foo.mutate(5); // mutates foo in place, permitted by the &mut specification, need foo to be declared mut
foo.consume(); // prints "5" and destroys foo, as Foo::consume() takes full ownership of self

// equivalent to foo.refer()
Foo::refer(foo); // compilation error: foo is out of scope

In Rust, the self keyword also refers to the current module (or namespace).

use std::io::{self, Read};

// equivalent to:
use std::io;
use std::io::Read;

fn foo() {
    // ...
}

fn bar() {
    // calls foo() in the current module
    self::foo()
}

=== Self ===
The Self language is named after this use of "self".

=== Xbase++ ===
Self is strictly used within methods of a class. Another way to refer to Self is to use ::.

== See also ==
- Anonymous recursion – Recursion without calling a function by name
- Inheritance (object-oriented programming) – Process of deriving classes from, and organizing them into, a hierarchy
- Self-reference – Sentence, idea or formula that refers to itself
- Schizophrenia (object-oriented programming) – Complication in object-oriented programming
- Program Segment Prefix – Data structure in DOS
