= Delegation (computing) =

Related programming concepts of responsibility for actions

In computing or computer programming, delegation refers generally to one entity passing something to another entity, and narrowly to various specific forms of relationships. These include:

- Delegation (object-oriented programming), evaluating a member of one object (the receiver) in the context of another, original object (the sender).
  - Delegation pattern, a design pattern implementing this feature.
  - Forwarding (object-oriented programming), an often-confused technique where a sending object uses the corresponding member of another object, without the receiving object having any knowledge of the original, sending object.
  - Object aggregation or consultation, general term for one object using another.
- Delegation (computer security), one user or process allowing another user or process to use their credentials or permissions.
- Delegate (CLI), a form of type-safe function pointer used by the Common Language Infrastructure (CLI), specifying both a method to call and optionally an object to call the method on.

== See also ==
- Delegation (disambiguation)
