= Virtual inheritance =

Technique in the C++ language

Diagram of diamond inheritance, a problem that virtual inheritance is trying to solve.

Virtual inheritance is a C++ technique that ensures only one copy of a base class's member variables are inherited by grandchild derived classes. Without virtual inheritance, if two classes B and C inherit from a class A, and a class D inherits from both B and C, then D will contain two copies of A's member variables: one via B, and one via C. These will be accessible independently, using scope resolution.

Instead, if classes B and C inherit virtually from class A, then objects of class D will contain only one set of the member variables from class A.

This feature is most useful for multiple inheritance, as it makes the virtual base a common subobject for the deriving class and all classes that are derived from it. This can be used to avoid the diamond problem by clarifying ambiguity over which ancestor class to use, as from the perspective of the deriving class (D in the example above) the virtual base (A) acts as though it were the direct base class of D, not a class derived indirectly through a base (B or C).

It is used when inheritance represents restriction of a set rather than composition of parts. In C++, a base class intended to be common throughout the hierarchy is denoted as virtual with the virtual keyword.

== The problem ==
Consider the following class hierarchy.

class Animal {
public:
    virtual ~Animal() = default;    // Explicitly show that the default class destructor will be made.
    virtual void eat() {}
};

class Mammal: public Animal {
public:
    virtual void breathe() {}
};

class WingedAnimal: public Animal {
public:
    virtual void flap() {}
};

// A bat is a winged mammal
class Bat: public Mammal, public WingedAnimal {};

As declared above, a call to bat.eat() is ambiguous because there are two Animal (indirect) base classes in Bat, so any Bat object has two different Animal base class subobjects. So, an attempt to directly bind a reference to the Animal subobject of a Bat object would fail, since the binding is inherently ambiguous:

Bat bat;
Animal& animal = bat;  
// error: which Animal subobject should a Bat cast into, 
// a Mammal::Animal or a WingedAnimal::Animal?

To disambiguate, one would have to explicitly convert bat to either base class subobject:

Bat bat;
Animal& mammal = static_cast<Mammal&>(bat); 
Animal& winged = static_cast<WingedAnimal&>(bat);

In order to call eat(), the same disambiguation, or explicit qualification is needed: static_cast<Mammal&>(bat).eat() or static_cast<WingedAnimal&>(bat).eat() or alternatively bat.Mammal::eat() and bat.WingedAnimal::eat(). Explicit qualification not only uses an easier, uniform syntax for both pointers and objects but also allows for static dispatch, so it would arguably be the preferable method.

In this case, the double inheritance of Animal is probably unwanted, as we want to model that the relation (Bat is an Animal) exists only once; that a Bat is a Mammal and is a WingedAnimal, does not imply that it is an Animal twice: an Animal base class corresponds to a contract that Bat implements (the "is a" relationship above really means "implements the requirements of"), and a Bat only implements the Animal contract once. The real world meaning of "is a only once" is that Bat should have only one way of implementing Eat, not two different ways, depending on whether the Mammal view of the Bat is eating, or the WingedAnimal view of the Bat. (In the first code example we see that Eat is not overridden in either Mammal or WingedAnimal, so the two Animal subobjects will actually behave the same, but this is just a degenerate case, and that does not make a difference from the C++ point of view.)

This situation is sometimes referred to as diamond inheritance (see Diamond problem) because the inheritance diagram is in the shape of a diamond. Virtual inheritance can help to solve this problem.

== The solution ==
We can re-declare our classes as follows:

class Animal {
public:
    virtual ~Animal() = default;
    virtual void eat() {}
};

// Two classes virtually inheriting Animal:
class Mammal: virtual public Animal {
public:
    virtual void breathe() {}
};

class WingedAnimal: virtual public Animal {
public:
    virtual void flap() {}
};

// A bat is still a winged mammal
class Bat: public Mammal, public WingedAnimal {};

The Animal portion of Bat::WingedAnimal is now the same Animal instance as the one used by Bat::Mammal, which is to say that a Bat has only one, shared, Animal instance in its representation and so a call to Bat::Eat is unambiguous. Additionally, a direct cast from Bat to Animal is also unambiguous, now that there exists only one Animal instance which Bat could be converted to.

The ability to share a single instance of the Animal parent between Mammal and WingedAnimal is enabled by recording the memory offset between the Mammal or WingedAnimal members and those of the base Animal within the derived class. However this offset can in the general case only be known at runtime, thus Bat must become (vpointer, Mammal, vpointer, WingedAnimal, Bat, Animal). There are two vtable pointers, one per inheritance hierarchy that virtually inherits Animal. In this example, one for Mammal and one for WingedAnimal. The object size has therefore increased by two pointers, but now there is only one Animal and no ambiguity. All objects of type Bat will use the same vpointers, but each Bat object will contain its own unique Animal object. If another class inherits from Mammal, such as Squirrel, then the vpointer in the Mammal part of Squirrel will generally be different to the vpointer in the Mammal part of Bat though they may happen to be the same if the Squirrel class is the same size as Bat.

=== Additional Example of Several Ancestors ===
This example to illustrates a case where base class A has a constructor variable msg and an additional ancestor E is derived from grandchild class D.

  A  
 / \  
B   C  
 \ /  
  D 
  |
  E

Here, A must be constructed in both D and E. Further, inspection of the variable msg illustrates how class A becomes a direct base class of its deriving class, as opposed to a base class of any intermediate deriving classed between A and the final deriving class.

import std;

using std::string;

class A { 
private: 
    string msg; 
public:
    explicit A(const string& s): 
        msg{s} {} 

    void test() { 
        std::println("Hello from A: {}", msg); 
    } 
}; 

// B, C inherit A virtually
class B: virtual public A { 
public: 
    B(): 
        A("instance of B") {}  
}; 

class C: virtual public A { 
public: 
    C(): 
        A("instance of C") {}  
}; 

// since B, C inherit A virtually, A must be constructed in each child
// B() and C() constructors can be omitted
class D: public B, public C { 
public: 
    D():
        A("instance of D"), B(), C() {}  
}; 

// D() constructor can be omitted
class E: public D { 
public: 
    E(): 
        A("instance of E"), D() {}  
}; 

// breaks without constructing A:
// class D: public B, public C { 
// public: 
//     D(): 
//         B(), C() {}  
// }; 

// breaks without constructing A
// class E: public D { 
// public: 
//    E(): 
//        D() {}  
// }; 


int main(int argc, char* argv[]) {
    D d; 
    d.test(); 
    // prints: "hello from A: instance of D" 

    E e; 
    e.test(); 
    // prints: "hello from A: instance of E"
}

==== Pure Virtual Methods ====
Suppose a pure virtual method is defined in the base class. If a deriving class inherits the base class virtually, then the pure virtual method does not need to be defined in that deriving class. However, if the deriving class does not inherit the base class virtually, then all virtual methods must be defined.

import std;

using std::string;

class A { 
protected: 
    string msg; 
public:
    explicit A(const string& s): 
        msg{s} {} 

    void test() { 
        std::println("Hello from A: {}", msg);
    }
 
    virtual void pureVirtualTest() = 0;
}; 

// since B, C inherit A virtually, the pure virtual method pureVirtualTest doesn't need to be defined
class B: virtual public A { 
public: 
    explicit B([[maybe_unused]] const string& s = ""):
        A("instance of B") {}  
}; 

class C: virtual public A { 
public: 
    explicit C([[maybe_unused]] const string& s = ""):
        A("instance of C") {}  
}; 

// since B, C inherit A virtually, A must be constructed in each child
// however, since D does not inherit B, C virtually, the pure virtual method in A *must be defined*
class D: public B, public C { 
public: 
    explicit D([[maybe_unused]] const string& s = ""):
        A("instance of D from constructor A"), 
        B("instance of D from constructor B"), 
        C("instance of D from constructor C") {}

    void pureVirtualTest() override { 
        std::println("Pure virtual hello from: {}", msg);
    }
}; 

// it is not necessary to redefine the pure virtual method after the parent defines it
class E: public D { 
public: 
    explicit E([[maybe_unused]] const string& s = ""):
        A("instance of E from constructor A"),
        D("instance of E from constructor D") {}  
};


int main(int argc, char* argv[]) {
    D d("d");
    d.test(); // Hello from A: instance of D from constructor A
    d.pureVirtualTest(); // Pure virtual hello from: instance of D from constructor A

    E e("e"); 
    e.test(); // Hello from A: instance of E from constructor A
    e.pureVirtualTest(); // Pure virtual hello from: instance of E from constructor A
}
