= Generation gap (disambiguation) =

Generation gap is a term for differences between people of a younger generation and their elders.

Generation gap may also refer to:

- Generation gap (pattern), a pattern for modifying or extending generated software code
- Generation Gap (game show), a 2022 American game show that airs on ABC
- Generation Gap, a 2004 American children's special starring Aileen Quinn that aired on PBS
- "Generation Gap", a single by Japanese rock band Gacharic Spin
- The Generation Gap, a 1969 American game show that aired on ABC
- "The Generation Gap" (song), a 1988 single by Hoodoo Gurus
- "The Generation Gap" (Bless This House), a television episode
