= Distributed design patterns =

In software engineering, a distributed design pattern is a software design pattern focused on distributed computing problems.

== Classification ==
Distributed design patterns can be divided into several groups:

- Distributed communication patterns
- Security and reliability patterns
- Event-driven patterns
- Saga pattern

== Examples ==
- MapReduce
- Bulk synchronous parallel
- Remote Session

== See also ==
- Software engineering
- Outline of software engineering
