= Concurrency pattern =

Software design pattern

A concurrency pattern is a software design pattern that supports concurrent processing.

== Examples ==
Examples include:

- Active object
- Balking pattern
- Barrier
- Double-checked locking
- Guarded suspension
- Monitor object
- Nuclear reaction
- Reactor pattern
- Readers–writer lock
- Scheduler pattern
- Thread pool pattern
- Thread-local storage

== See also ==
- Behavioral pattern
- Creational pattern
- Design Patterns
- Structural pattern
