= Creational pattern =

Software design pattern for object creation

A creational pattern is a software design pattern for creating objects in a manner suitable to a particular situation. As object creation that is otherwise available (i.e. via the programming language) can sometimes result in design limitations, a custom mechanism for creation can provide for better design. A creational pattern aims to separate a system from how its objects are created, composed, and represented. They increase the system's flexibility in terms of the what, who, how, and when of object creation.

A creational pattern encapsulates two main aspects. One is encapsulating knowledge about which concrete classes the system uses. Another is hiding how instances of these concrete classes are created and combined.

Creational design patterns are categorized into object-creational patterns and class-creational patterns. Object-creational patterns defer part of its object creation to another object, while class-creational patterns defer its object creation to subclasses.

== Usage ==
As modern software engineering depends more on object composition than class inheritance, emphasis shifts away from hard-coding behaviors toward defining a smaller set of basic behaviors that can be composed into more complex ones. Hard-coding behaviors are inflexible because they require overriding or re-implementing the whole thing in order to change parts of the design. Additionally, hard-coding does not promote reuse and makes it difficult to keep track of errors. For these reasons, creational patterns are more useful than hard-coding behaviors. Creational patterns make design become more flexible. They provide different ways to remove explicit references in the concrete classes from the code that needs to instantiate them. In other words, they create independency for objects and classes.

Consider applying creational patterns when:

- A system should be independent of how its objects and products are created.
- A set of related objects is designed to be used together.
- Hiding the implementations of a class library or product, revealing only their interfaces.
- Constructing different representation of independent complex objects.
- A class wants its subclass to implement the object it creates.
- The class instantiations are specified at run-time.
- There must be a single instance and client can access this instance at all times.
- Instance should be extensible without being modified.

== Structure ==
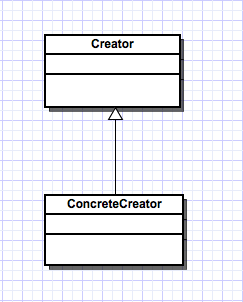
Creational Pattern class diagram.

Below is a simple class diagram that most creational patterns have in common. Note that different creational patterns require additional and different participated classes.

Participants:

- Creator: Declares object interface. Returns object.
- ConcreteCreator: Implements object's interface.

== Examples ==
Some examples of creational design patterns include:

Abstract factory pattern
a class requests the objects it requires from a factory object instead of creating the objects directly.
Factory method pattern
centralize creation of an object of a specific type choosing one of several implementations.
Builder pattern
separate the construction of a complex object from its representation so that the same construction process can create different representations.
Dependency injection pattern
a class accepts the objects it requires from an injector instead of creating the objects directly
Lazy initialization pattern
tactic of delaying the creation of an object, the calculation of a value, or some other expensive process until the first time it is needed.
Object pool pattern
avoid expensive acquisition and release of resources by recycling objects that are no longer in use.
Prototype pattern
used when the type of objects to create is determined by a prototypical instance, which is cloned to produce new objects.
Singleton pattern
restrict instantiation of a class to one object.

== See also ==
- Constructor
- Behavioral pattern
- Concurrency pattern
- Structural pattern
