= Blackboard (design pattern) =

Type of design pattern

In software engineering, the blackboard pattern is a behavioral design pattern that provides a computational framework for the design and implementation of systems that integrate large and diverse specialized modules, and implement complex, non-deterministic control strategies.

This pattern was identified by the members of the Hearsay-II project and first applied to speech recognition.

== Structure ==
The blackboard model defines three main components:

- blackboard—a structured global memory containing objects from the solution space
- knowledge sources—specialized modules with their own representation
- control component—selects, configures and executes modules.

== Implementation ==
The first step is to design the solution space (i.e. potential solutions) that leads to the blackboard structure. Then, knowledge sources are identified. These two activities are closely related.

The next step is to specify the control component; it generally takes the form of a complex scheduler that makes use of a set of domain-specific heuristics to rate the relevance of executable knowledge sources.

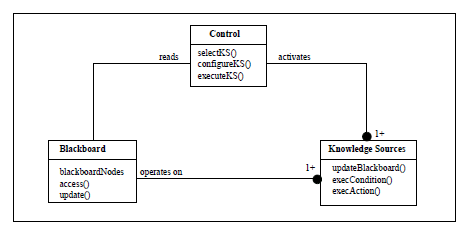
System Structure

== Applications ==
Usage-domains include:

- speech recognition
- vehicle identification and tracking
- protein structure identification
- sonar signals interpretation.

== Consequences ==
The blackboard pattern provides effective solutions for designing and implementing complex systems where heterogeneous modules have to be dynamically combined to solve a problem. This provides non-functional properties such as:

- reusability
- changeability
- robustness.

The blackboard pattern allows multiple processes to work closer together on separate threads, polling and reacting when necessary.

== See also ==
- Blackboard system
- Software design pattern
