= Structural pattern =

A structural pattern is a software design pattern that encapsulates relationships between entities.

== Examples ==
Examples include:

Adapter pattern
Adapts one interface for a class into one that a client expects.

Adapter pipeline
Use multiple adapters for debugging purposes.
Retrofit Interface Pattern
An adapter used as a new interface for multiple classes at the same time.

Aggregate pattern
A version of the Composite pattern with methods for aggregation of children.
Bridge pattern
decouple an abstraction from its implementation so that the two can vary independently.

Tombstone
An intermediate lookup object contains the real location of an object.

Composite pattern
A tree structure of objects where every object has the same interface.
Decorator pattern
Supports adding additional functionality to an object at runtime. Prevents issue where subclassing would result in an exponential rise of new classes.
Extensibility pattern
a.k.a. framework, Hides complex code behind a simple interface.
Facade pattern
Creates a simplified interface of an existing interface to ease usage for common tasks.
Flyweight pattern
A large quantity of objects share a common properties object to save space.
Marker interface pattern
An empty interface to associate metadata with a class.
Pipes and filters
A chain of processes where the output of each process is the input of the next.
Opaque pointer
A pointer to an undeclared or private type, to hide implementation details.
Proxy pattern
A class functioning as an interface to another thing.

== See also ==
- Behavioral pattern
- Concurrency pattern
- Creational pattern
