= Concurrent object-oriented programming =

Programming paradigm

Concurrent object-oriented programming is a programming paradigm which combines object-oriented programming (OOP) together with concurrency. While numerous programming languages, such as Java, combine OOP with concurrency mechanisms like threads, the phrase "concurrent object-oriented programming" primarily refers to systems where objects themselves are a concurrency primitive, such as when objects are combined with the actor model.

== See also ==
- Active object
