= Programming idiom =

Common way to code a relatively small construct

In programming and in code, an idiom describes a commonly-used way to code a relatively small construct in a particular programming context (i.e. programming language). Many such constructs are found in multiple programming contexts yet tend to vary by context. Like a linguistic idiom, a programming idiom is a commonly-used way to express a concept in a language that exists outside the definition of the language yet is constrained by it.

Similar to a software design pattern, an idiom is a template to be followed, not code that can be copy-and-pasted into a codebase. In this sense, an idiom is a pattern, yet software design pattern is a classification reserved for significantly larger-scale functionality; usually involving the interaction of multiple objects.

Using the idioms for a programming context (instead of using idiosyncratic constructs) helps a team work together since they lower the cognitive load of the resulting code. Such idiomatic use is common in crowdsourced repositories to help developers overcome programming barriers.

== Examples ==
=== Writing to standard output ===
Writing to standard output is generally something covered early when learning a language; it is often presented through the task of writing a hello world program.

A common idiom in C++ like:

std::println("Hello World");

For Java:

System.out.println("Hello World");

For Rust:

println!("Hello World");

For Python:

print("Hello, World")

=== Using dynamic memory ===
In C, use the C dynamic memory allocation functions such as malloc() and free().

In C++, use the new and delete operators. The C dynamic memory allocation functions are usable in C++, but would generally be considered idiosyncratic.

== See also ==
- Algorithmic skeleton
- Embedded SQL
- Idiom
