= Scheduled-task pattern =

A scheduled-task pattern is a type of software design pattern used with real-time systems. It is not to be confused with the "scheduler pattern".

While the scheduler pattern delays access to a resource (be it a function, variable, or otherwise) only as long as absolutely needed, the scheduled-task pattern delays execution until a determined time. This is important in real-time systems for a variety of reasons.

== See also ==
- Command pattern
- Memento pattern
