= Instance (computer science) =

Concrete manifestation of an element (type) in computer science

In computer science, an instance is an occurrence of a software element that is based on a type definition. When created, an occurrence is said to have been instantiated, and both the creation process and the result of creation are called instantiation.

== Examples ==
Chat AI instance
In chat-based AI systems, an assistant can be invoked across many independent conversation sessions (often called a thread), each with its own message history. A specific execution of the assistant over that session may be represented as a run (an execution on a thread).

Class instance
In object-oriented programming, an object created from a class type. Each instance of a class shares the class-defined structure and behavior but has its own identity and state.

Procedural instance
In some contexts (including Simula), each procedure call can be viewed as an instance of that procedure—an activation with its own parameters and local variables.

Computer instance
In cloud computing and virtualization, an instance commonly refers to a provisioned virtual machine or virtual server with an allocated combination of compute, memory, network, and storage resources.

Polygonal model
In computer graphics, a model may be instanced so it can be drawn multiple times with different transforms and parameters, improving performance by reusing shared geometry data.

Program instance
In a POSIX-oriented operating system, a running process is an instance of a program. It can be instantiated via system calls such as fork() and exec(). Each executing process is an instance of a program it has been instantiated from.
