= Ralph Johnson (computer scientist) =

American computer scientist

Ralph E. Johnson
- Occupation: Research Associate Professor
- Known for: Design Patterns, JUnit, Eclipse, Visual Studio Online "Monaco", Visual Studio Code
- Awards: 2010 ACM SIGSOFT Outstanding Research Award; 2006 Dahl–Nygaard Prize
- Scientific career
- Workplaces: University of Illinois at Urbana-Champaign
- Website: cs.illinois.edu/directory/profile/rjohnson

Ralph E. Johnson is a Research Associate Professor in the Department of Computer Science at the University of Illinois at Urbana-Champaign. He is a co-author of the influential computer science textbook Design Patterns: Elements of Reusable Object-Oriented Software, for which he won the 2010 ACM SIGSOFT Outstanding Research Award. In 2006 he was awarded the Dahl–Nygaard Prize for his contributions to the state of the art embodied in that book as well.

Johnson was an early pioneer in the Smalltalk community and is a continued supporter of the language. He has held several executive roles at the ACM Object-Oriented Programming, Systems, Languages and Applications conference OOPSLA. He initiated the popular OOPSLA Design Fest workshop.
