= Richard Helm =

Swiss computer scientist

- Education: University of Melbourne
- Known for: Design Patterns, JUnit, Eclipse, Visual Studio Online "Monaco", Visual Studio Code
- Awards: 2005 Programming Languages Achievement Award - Awarded by ACM's Special Interest Group on Programming Languages (SIGPLAN), Dahl–Nygaard Prize (2006), ACM SIGSOFT Outstanding Research Award (2010)
- Scientific career
- Fields: Mathematics and Computer Science
- Workplaces: IBM, DMR Group, IBM Consulting, Platinion (Australia), Boston Consulting Group
- Thesis: Detection and elimination of redundant derivations in logic programming systems (1991)

Richard Helm is one of the co-authors (referred to as the "Gang of Four") of the influential Design Patterns book. In 2006 he was awarded the Dahl–Nygaard Prize for his contributions to the state of the art embodied in that book. He received the ACM SIGSOFT Outstanding Research Award in 2010.
