= John Vlissides =

Software engineer

John Matthew Vlissides
- Occupations: Research Associate Professor, University of Illinois at Urbana-Champaign
- Known for: Design Patterns, JUnit, Eclipse, Visual Studio Online "Monaco", Visual Studio Code
- Awards: 2010 ACM SIGSOFT Outstanding Research Award; 2006 Dahl–Nygaard Prize
- Website: Ralph E. Johnson at UIUC

John Matthew Vlissides (August 2, 1961 – November 24, 2005) was a software engineer known mainly as one of the four authors (referred to as the Gang of Four) of the book Design Patterns: Elements of Reusable Object-Oriented Software. Vlissides referred to himself as "#4 of the Gang of Four and wouldn't have it any other way".

== Education and career ==
Vlissides studied electrical engineering at University of Virginia and Stanford University. Since 1986 he worked as software engineer, consultant, research assistant and scholar at Stanford University. From 1991 he stayed at IBM T.J. Watson Research Center in Hawthorne, New York as research staff member. He was author of several books, of many magazine articles and conference papers and was awarded with several patents. His work concentrated on object oriented technology, design patterns and software modeling.

== Death ==
John Vlissides died on Thanksgiving 2005 (November 24, 2005) following a struggle with complications from a brain tumor. He was 44 years old.

== Posthumous ==
Ward Cunningham and Grady Booch (on his blog entry of Nov 27, relaying a call from John Vlissides's widow, Dru Ann) have called for stories to remember him by. Since then, there has been a steady inflow of contributions located at the WikiWikiWeb page for Vlissides.

In recognition of the contributions to computer science that John Vlissides made during his lifetime, ACM SIGPLAN has established the John Vlissides Award. The award is presented annually to a doctoral student participating in the OOPSLA Doctoral Symposium showing significant promise in applied software research.
