= Erich Gamma =

Swiss computer scientist (born 1961)

- Born: Zürich
- Citizenship: Swiss
- Education: University of Zurich
- Known for: Design Patterns, JUnit, Eclipse, Visual Studio Online "Monaco", Visual Studio Code
- Awards: Dahl–Nygaard Prize 2006; ACM SIGSOFT Outstanding Research Award 2010
- Scientific career
- Fields: Software engineering

Erich Gamma is a Swiss computer scientist and one of the four co-authors (referred to as "Gang of Four") of the software engineering textbook Design Patterns: Elements of Reusable Object-Oriented Software.

Gamma, along with Kent Beck, co-wrote the JUnit software testing framework which helped create test-driven development and helped influence and revolutionized the whole software industry. He was the development team lead of the Eclipse platform's Java Development Tools (JDT), and worked on the IBM Rational Jazz project.

In 2011 he joined the Microsoft Visual Studio team and leads a development lab in Zürich, Switzerland, that has developed the "Monaco" suite of components for browser-based development, found in products such as Azure DevOps Services (formerly Visual Studio Team Services and Visual Studio Online), Visual Studio Code, Azure Mobile Services, Azure Web Sites, and the Office 365 Development tools.
