= Lava flow (programming) =

Issue of incomplete software being deployed

In computer programming jargon, lava flow is an anti-pattern that occurs when computer source code written under sub-optimal conditions is deployed into a production environment and subsequently expanded upon while still in a developmental state. The term derives from the natural occurrence of lava which, once cooled, solidifies into rock that is difficult to remove. Similarly, such code becomes difficult to refactor or replace due to dependencies that arise over time, necessitating the maintenance of backward compatibility with the original, incomplete design.

== Causes ==
Lava flow can occur due to a variety of reasons within a software development process:

- Pressure to meet deadlines leading to temporary solutions becoming permanent
- Inadequate documentation which prevents understanding of the code’s purpose
- Lack of automated tests which makes refactoring risky
- Frequent changes in the development team leading to loss of knowledge

== Consequences ==
Unrefined code that becomes part of the software’s infrastructure increases the complexity of the system and the codebase becomes increasingly difficult to understand and maintain. It leads to:

- The need for backward compatibility which can stifle innovation and prevent adoption of newer, more efficient solutions
- Increased technical debt that accumulates over time, resulting in higher costs of change and maintenance
- Obstacles to refactoring or improving the system due to fear of breaking dependent components

== Impact on teams ==
Development teams often experience the impact of lava flow when team members cycle in and out:

- Loss of knowledge about aspects of the system's code when original developers leave
- Reluctance among new developers to refactor unfamiliar code, leading to further complexity as they add rather than clean up

== Mitigation strategies ==
Several practices can mitigate the effects of the lava flow anti-pattern:

- Promoting good documentation practices for clear understanding of code
- Encouraging regular code reviews to catch suboptimal practices early
- Prioritizing refactoring as an integral part of the development lifecycle
- Maintaining a comprehensive suite of automated tests to reduce risk in changes
