= Poltergeist (disambiguation) =

A poltergeist is a troublesome spirit or ghost that manifests itself by moving and influencing objects.

Poltergeist may also refer to:

== Films ==
- Poltergeist (film series), series of horror films
  - Poltergeist (1982 film), a horror film
  - Poltergeist II: The Other Side, 1986 film
  - Poltergeist III, 1988 film
  - Poltergeist (2015 film), a remake of the 1982 film

== Music ==
- Poltergeist (album), release by death metal band Deathchain
- Poltergeist (band), a Swiss thrash metal band that played from the late 1980s to early 1990s
- "Poltergeist", a song by Banks from the album The Altar
- "Poltergeist", a song by Blackbear from the album In Loving Memory
- "Poltergeist", a song by Deftones from the album Koi No Yokan

== Other uses ==
- Poltergeist (planet), the first exoplanet and pulsar planet that was discovered
- Regininha Poltergeist (born 1971), Brazilian model, performance artist and actress
- Poltergeist (computer programming), short-lived, typically stateless object used to perform initialization or to invoke methods in another, more permanent class
- Poltergeist (roller coaster), steel roller coaster located at Six Flags Fiesta Texas in San Antonio, Texas
- Poltergeist!: A Study in Destructive Haunting, a 1981 non-fiction book by Colin Wilson
- Poltergeist: The Legacy, Canadian/American horror television series which ran from 1996 to 1999

== See also ==
- Cowan–Reines neutrino experiment, part of Project Poltergeist, the search for neutrinos
