= Rewrite (programming) =

Concept in programming

In computer programming, rewrite is the act of authoring new source code to replace an existing codebase from scratch (a total rewrite) or to significantly modify an existing codebase such that the resulting code maintains essential aspects of the original. The essential aspects to be maintained for a rewrite effort may differ but often include behavior, performance and interface. The result of the effort is also called a rewrite.

== Motivations ==
Common motivations for rewriting software include:

- The source code is not available or is protected by an incompatible license.
- The code cannot be adapted to a new target platform; perhaps a different programming language must be used, since there is no support for the original code on the target platform.
- The code is too difficult to understand, maintain, extend or debug.
- There is a desire to use new techniques or technologies, especially when desired enhancements would require significant change.

== Risks ==
Some warn against a total rewrite, especially under schedule constraints or competitive pressures. While developers may initially welcome the chance to correct historical design mistakes, a rewrite also discards those parts of the design that work as required. A rewrite commits the development team to deliver not just new features, but all those that exist in the previous code, while potentially introducing new bugs or regressions of previously fixed bugs. A rewrite also interferes with the tracking of unfixed bugs in the old version.

The incremental rewrite is an alternative approach, in which developers gradually replace the existing code with calls into a new implementation, expanding that implementation until it fully replaces the old one. This approach avoids a broad loss of functionality during the rewrite. Cleanroom software engineering is another approach, which requires the team to work from an exhaustive written specification of the software's functionality, without access to its code.

== Examples ==
Netscape's project to improve HTML layout in Navigator 4 has been cited as an example of a failed rewrite. The new layout engine (Gecko) had developed independently of Navigator and did not integrate readily with Navigator's code. Hence, Navigator itself was rewritten around the new engine, breaking many existing features and delaying release by several months. Meanwhile, Microsoft focused on incremental improvements to Internet Explorer and did not face the same obstacles.

== See also ==
- Development hell – Term for media projects stuck in development
- Game engine recreation – Type of video game engine remastering process
- Open source software development – Freely accessible creation and refinement of computer programs
- Porting – Process of adapting software to run in a different context
- Reverse engineering – Process of extracting design information from anything artificial
- Strangler fig pattern – Computer science architectural pattern
- Technical debt – Cost of maintaining a low quality system
