= List of software architecture styles and patterns =

In software engineering, an architecture pattern is a reusable, proven solution to a recurring problem at the system level, addressing concerns related to the overall structure, component interactions, and quality attributes of the system. Software architecture patterns operate at a higher level of abstraction than software design patterns, solving broader system-level challenges. While these patterns typically affect system-level concerns, the distinction between architectural patterns and architectural styles can sometimes be blurry. Examples include Circuit Breaker.

Software architecture style is a high-level structural organization that defines the overall system organization, specifying how components are organized, how they interact, and the constraints on those interactions. Architecture styles typically include a vocabulary of component and connector types, as well as semantic models for interpreting the system's properties. These styles represent the most coarse-grained level of system organization. Examples include Layered Architecture, Microservices, and Event-Driven Architecture.

== List of software architecture styles ==
- Event-driven architecture
- Hexagonal Architecture (also known as Ports and Adapters)
- Layered architecture
- Microkernel architecture
- Pipes and Filters architecture
- Microservices
- (Modular) monolithic
- Service-oriented architecture
- "Service-based architecture"
- Space-based architecture

== List of software architecture patterns ==
- Inbox and outbox pattern
- "Queue-Based Load Leveling", also known as the "Storage First Pattern", is an architectural pattern in which a queue acts as a buffer between an invoker service (such as an API Gateway) and the destination (e.g., compute resources).
- "Backends for frontends" pattern
- "Public versus Published Interfaces"
- Asynchronous messaging
- Batch request (also known as Request Bundle pattern)
- Blackboard (design pattern)
- Circuit Breaker
- Client–server model
- Competing Consumers pattern
- Model–view–controller
- Claim-Check pattern
- Peer-to-peer
- Publish–subscribe pattern
- Rate limiting
- Request–response
- Retry pattern
- Rule-based
- Saga pattern
- Strangler fig pattern
- Throttling

== See also ==
- Category: Software design patterns
- Software design pattern
- Software architecture
