= Product architect =

Product architect may refer to:

- Software architect
- Product design
