= Ambiguous viewpoint =

Lack of clarity during software design

Object-oriented analysis and design (OOAD) models are often presented without clarifying the viewpoint represented by the model. By default, these models denote an implementation viewpoint that visualises the structure of a computer program. Mixed viewpoints do not support the fundamental separation of interfaces from implementation details, which is one of the primary benefits of the object-oriented paradigm. An ambiguous or mixed viewpoint is an anti-pattern.

In object-oriented analysis and design there are three viewpoints: The business viewpoint (the information that is domain specific and matters to the end user), the specification viewpoint (which defines the exposed interface elements of a class), and the implementation viewpoint (which deals with the actual internal implementation of the class). If the viewpoint becomes mixed then these elements will blend together in a way which makes it difficult to separate out and maintain the internals of an object without changing the interface, one of the core tenets of object-oriented analysis and design.

== See also ==
- Class-Responsibility-Collaboration card
- Unified Modeling Language
- Object-oriented analysis
- Object-oriented design
