= Business delegate pattern =

Business delegate is a Java EE design pattern. This pattern is directed towards reducing the coupling in between business services and the connected presentation tier, and to hide the implementation details of services (including lookup and accessibility of EJB architecture). Business delegates acts as an adaptor to invoke business objects from the presentation tier.

== Structure ==
Requests to access underlying business services are sent from clients, and lookup services are used by business delegates to locate the business service components.

=== Components ===
Basic components are Business delegate, Lookup service and business service.

==== Business delegate ====
Control and protection are provided through business delegate which can have two types of structures, without ID and with ID, where ID is a string version of the reference to a remote object such as EJBHome or EJBObject.

==== Lookup service ====
Business service is located by lookup service which is used by the business delegate. The implementation details of business service lookup is encapsulated by lookup service.

==== Business service ====
This a business-tier component, such as an enterprise bean or a JMS component, which provides the required service to the client.

== Consequences ==
Some consequences are as follows:

- More flexibility and maintainability as intermediate business delegate layer decouples the business layer from the presentation layer.
- Business delegate exposes a uniform API to the presentation tier to access business logic.

== Concerns ==
Following concerns can be considered:

- Maintenance due to the extra layer that increases the number of classes in the application.
- Business delegate should take care of the changes of the remote business object interfaces, and these types of changes are rare.

== Sample code ==
A sample code for a Professional Services Application (PSA), where a Web-tier client needs to access a session bean that implements the session facade pattern, is provided below.

Resource Delegate:

public class ResourceDelegate {

    // Remote reference for Session Facade
    private ResourceSession session;

    // Class for Session Facade's Home object
    private static final Class homeClazz =
    corepatterns.apps.psa.ejb.ResourceSessionHome.class;

    // Default Constructor. Looks up home and connects
    // to session by creating a new one
    public ResourceDelegate() throws ResourceException {
        try {
            ResourceSessionHome home = (ResourceSessionHome)
                ServiceLocator.getInstance().getHome(
                    "Resource", homeClazz);
            session = home.create();
        } catch (ServiceLocatorException ex) {
            // Translate Service Locator exception into
            // application exception
            throw new ResourceException(...);
        } catch (CreateException ex) {
            // Translate the Session create exception into
            // application exception
            throw new ResourceException(...);
        } catch (RemoteException ex) {
            // Translate the Remote exception into
            // application exception
            throw new ResourceException(...);
        }
    }

    public BusinessDelegate(String id)
        throws ResourceException {
        super();
        reconnect(id);
    }

    public String getID() {
        try {
            return ServiceLocator.getId(session);
        } catch (Exception e) {
            // Throw an application exception
        }
    }

    public void reconnect(String id) 
        throws ResourceException {
        try {
            session = (ResourceSession)ServiceLocator.getService(id);
        } catch (RemoteException ex) {
            // Translate the Remote exception into
            // application exception
            throw new ResourceException(...);
        }
    }

    public ResourceTO setCurrentResource(
        String resourceId)
        throws ResourceException {
        try {
            return session.setCurrentResource(resourceId);
        } catch (RemoteException ex) {
            // Translate the service exception into
            // application exception
            throw new ResourceException(...);
        }
    }

    public ResourceTO getResourceDetails()
        throws ResourceException {

        try {
            return session.getResourceDetails();
        } catch (RemoteException ex) {
            // Translate the service exception into
            // application exception
            throw new ResourceException(...);
        }
    }

    public void setResourceDetails(ResourceTO vo)
        throws ResourceException {
        try {
            session.setResourceDetails(vo);
        } catch (RemoteException ex) {
            throw new ResourceException(...);
        }
    }

    public void addNewResource(ResourceTO vo)
        throws ResourceException {
        try {
            session.addResource(vo);
        } catch (RemoteException ex) {
            throw new ResourceException(...);
        }
    }

    // all other proxy method to session bean
    ...
}

== See also ==
- service locator pattern
- Proxy pattern
- Adapter pattern
- Broker Pattern
