= Fibre Channel time-out values =

Fibre Channel time-out values are values used for error detection and recovery in the Fibre Channel protocol. The FC-PH standard defines three time-out values:

1. E_D_TOV (Error Detect TimeOut Value) is the basic error timeout used for all Fibre Channel error detection. Its default value is 2 seconds.
2. R_A_TOV (Resource Allocation TimeOut Value) is the amount of time given to devices to allocate the resources needed to process received frames. In practice this may be the time for re-calculation of routing tables in network devices. Its default value is 10 seconds.
3. R_T_TOV (Receiver-Transmitter TimeOut Value) is the amount of time that the receiver logic uses to determine loss of sync on the wire. Its default value is 100 milliseconds, but can be changed to 100 microseconds.

All devices must use the default values until and unless they have established different values with other devices, usually specified during the login procedure.
