= Inbox and outbox pattern =

Patterns for database applications

The inbox pattern and outbox pattern are two related patterns used by applications to persist data (usually in a database) to be used for operations with guaranteed delivery. The inbox and outbox concepts are used in the ActivityPub protocol and in email.

== The inbox pattern ==
The application receives data which it persists to an inbox table in a database. Once the data has been persisted another application, process or service can read from the inbox table and use the data to perform an operation which it can retry upon failure until completion, the operation may take a long time to complete. The inbox pattern ensures that a message was received (e.g. from a queue) successfully at least once.

== The outbox pattern ==
The application persists data to an outbox table in a database. Once the data has been persisted another application or process can read from the outbox table and use that data to perform an operation which it can retry upon failure until completion. The outbox pattern ensures that a message was sent (e.g. to a queue) successfully at least once.

== See also ==
- Enterprise service bus
- List of software architecture styles and patterns
- Message broker
