= Manumation =

Hardware control systems

Manumation is the automation of paper based processes in public sector and business without improvement regarding its efficiency. Automation of an inefficient process does not lead to an improvement in case of manumation. This term could be seen as a sarcastic description of the digital replication and mimicking of frequently ineffective and even broken paper-based processes in first phase of the societal digitalisation, from 1995 to 2015.

Manumation is also a term for automated systems, which require more manual work than the original manual process.

== Definitions ==
| Origin | Year | Definition |
|---|---|---|
| Motamarri Saradhi | 1994 | "[M]anumation is the narrow interpretation of the work analysis ... as the study of the existing system in view of computerizing its operations" |
| William K. Holstein and Jakov Crnkovic | 2003 | Formula for manumation is "Old Processes plus New Technology equals Expensive Old Processes" |
| Hans J. Scholl | 2005 | "[C]omputer-aiding existing processes and procedures, while processes and structures basically [remain] unchanged" |

== Examples ==
Computerized transaction processing is the automation of previously manual transactions.

== See also ==
- Semi-automation
