= Poltergeist (computer programming) =

Inappropriate short-lived object

In computer programming, a poltergeist (or gypsy wagon) is a short-lived, typically stateless object used to perform initialization or to invoke methods in another, more permanent class. It is considered an anti-pattern. The original definition is by Michael Akroyd at the 1996 Object World West Conference:

As a gypsy wagon or a poltergeist appears and disappears mysteriously, so does this short lived object. As a consequence the code is more difficult to maintain and there is unnecessary resource waste. The typical cause for this anti-pattern is poor object design.

A poltergeist can often be identified by its name; they often include words such as "Manager", "Controller", "Supervisor", "StartProcess", etc. in the name.

Sometimes, poltergeist classes are created because the programmer anticipated the need for a more complex architecture. For example, a poltergeist arises if the same method acts as both the client and invoker in a command pattern, and the programmer anticipates separating the two phases. However, this more complex architecture may actually never materialize.

Poltergeists should not be confused with long-lived, state-bearing objects of a pattern such as model–view–controller, or tier-separating patterns such as business delegate pattern.

To remove a poltergeist, delete the class and insert its functionality in the invoked class, possibly by inheritance or as a mixin.

There have been proposed methods in detecting poltergeists in code for refactoring.

== Example ==
This Poltergeist class in this C++ example can be seen as a "poltergeist object", due to not adding additional functionality or encapsulation and only increasing complexity with unnecessary abstraction.

import std;

using String = std::string;

// Poltergeist class that just holds a pointer, but adds no meaningful behavior
class Poltergeist {
private:
    String* s; // pointer to string, but the class itself doesn't do anything useful
public:
    explicit Poltergeist(String* s):
        s{s} {}

    ~Poltergeist() {
        delete s;
    }

    [[nodiscard]]
    String get() const noexcept {
        return s;
    }

    // No additional behavior or meaningful functionality
};

int main() {
    // Create a Poltergeist object that just holds a pointer to the string
    Poltergeist p(new String("Hello, world!"));

    // Just passes the data around without adding value
    std::println(*p.get());

    return 0;
}

This could instead be more appropriately done using a smart pointer.

import std;

using String = std::string;
template <typename T>
using UniquePtr = std::unique_ptr<T>;

// Use smart pointers directly to manage memory
UniquePtr<String> s = std::make_unique<String>("Hello, World!");
std::println(*s);

Another example of a poltergeist/gypsy wagon object, is the following, where UserCreator is instantiated just to perform some basic actions.

import std;

using String = std::string;

class UserManager {
public:
    void createUser(const String& name) {
        std::println("User created: {}", name);
    }
};

// The poltergeist class
class UserCreator {
public:
    explicit UserCreator(const String& name) {
        UserManager manager;
        manager.createUser(name);
    }
};

int main() {
    // Creating a poltergeist just to call createUser()
    UserCreator("Alice");
    UserCreator("Bob");
}

This could be more appropriately done like so, avoiding any poltergeist class entirely:

// Avoid the UserCreator poltergeist entirely
int main() {
    UserManager manager;
    manager.createUser("Alice");
    manager.createUser("Bob");
}

== See also ==
- Anti-pattern
- Factory (object-oriented programming)
- YAGNI principle
