= AntiPatterns =

AntiPatterns: Refactoring Software, Architectures, and Projects in Crisis
- Author: The "Upstart Gang of Four": William Brown, Raphael Malveau, Skip McCormick, Tom Mowbray
- Subject: Design patterns, software engineering, anti-patterns
- Publisher: John Wiley & Sons, Ltd.
- Publication date: 1998
- Publication place: United States
- ISBN: 978-0-471-19713-3

AntiPatterns: Refactoring Software, Architectures, and Projects in Crisis is a book about anti-patterns: specific repeated practices in software architecture, software design and software project management that initially appear to be beneficial, but ultimately result in bad consequences that outweigh hoped-for advantages. This study covers several recurring problematic software-related patterns, the forces that inspire their repeated adoption, and proven-in-practice remedial actions, called refactored solutions. The authors are William Brown, Raphael Malveau, Skip McCormick, and Tom Mowbray; with Scott Thomas joining in on second and third books. Four of the five authors worked together at Mitre Corporation in the late 1990s.

Sometimes referred to as an "Upstart Gang-Of-Four" the authors were frequently (and often unfavorably) compared to the original Design Patterns by Gang of Four. This began with a favorable review and 1998 runner-up Jolt Productivity Award given by Software Development magazine. The controversy around this book, and the concept of an anti-pattern has been said to stem from a somewhat common misunderstanding that the authors were somehow opposed to design patterns. However the authors explained within the book itself that they are big fans of design patterns; their objective was to build on the concept by providing constructive means for dealing with the frequent "patterns of failure" they had professionally dealt with.

== Reviews ==
- J. Moore (1999-02-01). "AntiPatterns". ACM Computing Reviews. Association for Computing Machinery.
- Reviewed in C/C++ Users Journal July 1998 v16 n7 p63(2) by Marc Briand July 1998/AntiPatterns - Refactoring Software, Architectures, and Projects in Crisis
