= Broker pattern =

Distributed software architecture pattern

The broker pattern is an architectural pattern that can be used to structure distributed software systems with decoupled components that interact by remote procedure calls. A broker component is responsible for coordinating communication, such as forwarding requests, as well as transmitting results and exceptions.

== Definition ==
The broker pattern is an architecture pattern that involves the use of an intermediary software entity, called a "broker", to facilitate communication between two or more software components. The broker acts as a "middleman" between the components, allowing them to communicate without being aware of each other's existence.

In the broker pattern, the broker is responsible for receiving messages from one component and forwarding them to the appropriate recipient. The components that communicate through the broker are known as servers or clients. The broker may also perform additional tasks, such as filtering, modifying messages, ensuring a quality of service (QoS) (e.g. 0 for "at most once"), security, or providing additional services to the software components.

The broker pattern allows the components to remain decoupled and focused on their own responsibilities, while still being able to communicate and collaborate with other components in the system. It can also be used to reduce the number of dependencies between components, making the system more flexible and easier to maintain.

== Terminology ==
Broker

- Maintain a routing table of registered software components.
- Maintain a filter table to reroute the transiting messages to the right software components.
- May assure additional functionalities such as information security and quality of service.

Server

- Software components responsible for sending a message out.
- It is also referred to as a publisher.

Client

- Software components that subscribed and await a specific message.
- It can also be referred to as a consumer or subscriber.

== Advantages ==
- Dynamic changes, additions, deletions, and relocations of components possible.
- One source of communication with the broker, which defines the interface.
- Components do not need to know each other.

== Disadvantages ==
- One central component that needs to be robust and efficiently written.
- No data consistency of transmitted messages.

== Real-life implementation of the pattern ==
- Message broker
- RabbitMQ
- MQTT

== Confusions around the pattern ==
The broker pattern and publish–subscribe pattern have some similarities and are sometimes confused. Nevertheless, when it comes to the representation, there are some core differences:

- The Broker architectural pattern is represented by a Many to One to Many diagram.
- The Publish-subscribe architectural pattern is represented by a Many to Many diagram. Here, the messaging functionalities are hidden as a Cross-cutting concern.
