= Brittle system =

Concept in systems theory

Brittle systems theory creates an analogy between communication theory and mechanical systems. A brittle system is a system characterized by a sudden and steep decline in performance as the system state changes. This can be due to input parameters that exceed a specified input, or environmental conditions that exceed specified operating boundaries. This is the opposite of a gracefully degrading system. Brittle system analysis develops an analogy with materials science in order to analyze system brittleness. A system that is brittle (but initially robust enough to gain at least some foothold in the marketplace) will tend to operate with acceptable performance until it reaches a limit and then degrade suddenly and catastrophically. The table below illustrates the concept behind the analysis using an example of a communication system.

Materials Science	Target System	Brittle Systems Analysis	Materials Science Quantification
Stress	Interbyte jitter, EMI, number of slaves, etc.	Amount parameter exceeds tolerance	Force per unit area within a body
Toughness	Ability to withstand the above	System robustness	Ability to absorb energy up to failure
Hardness*	Constant latency, throughput with stress in tolerance	Level of performance within tolerance	Resistance to deformation
Ductility*	Gradual reduction in latency, throughput as stress exceeds tolerance	Level of performance out of tolerance	Fracture strain or reduction of area at fracture
Plastic strain	Latency, throughput are permanently degraded	System cannot recover from degradation	Deformation between particles in a body relative to length
Reversible strain	Latency, throughput are temporarily degraded	System can recover from degradation	Same as above, but returns to normal after force removed
Brittle fracture	Sudden steep decline in latency, throughput	Sudden steep decline in performance	There is no reduction of area when material breaks
Ductile fracture	Graceful degradation in latency, throughput	Graceful degradation in performance	The area at the point of fracture gradually reduces to zero
Brittleness*	Hardness over ductility	Ratio of hardness over ductility	Ratio of hardness over ductility
Deformation	Degradation in latency, throughput	Degradation in performance	Change in shape of a material
Young's modulus	Stress (jitter/EMI) over reduction in latency and throughput	Amount of tolerance exceeded over degradation	Measure of the stiffness of an elastic material

== See also ==
- Reliability engineering – Sub-discipline of systems engineering that emphasizes dependability
- Catastrophe theory – Area of mathematics
