= Interface bloat =

Overload of elements on an interface

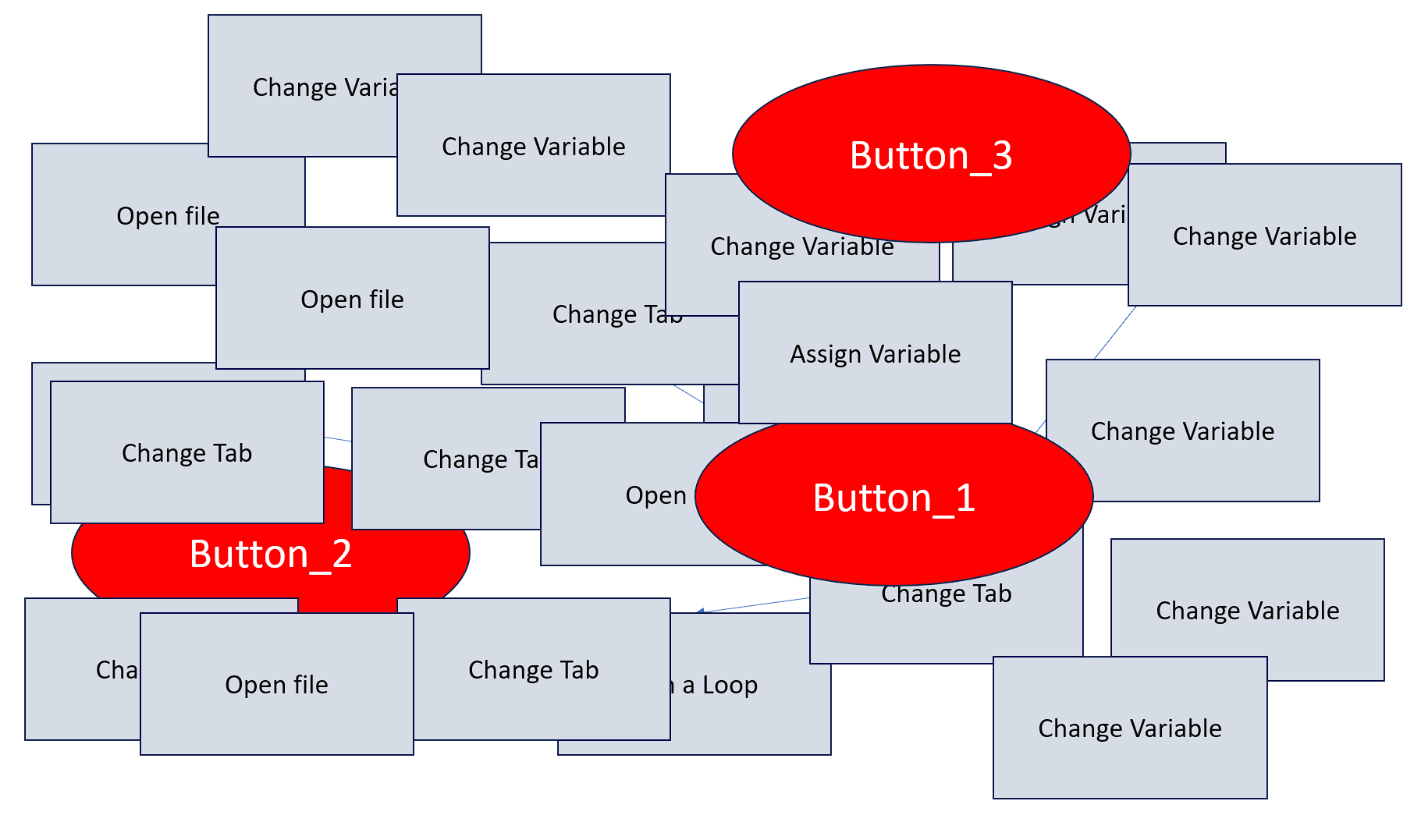
An example of interface bloat

Interface bloat is a phenomenon in software design where an interface incorporates too many (often unnecessary) operations or elements, causing issues such as difficulty navigating and usability.

== Definition ==
While the term bloat can refer to a variety of terms in software design, Interface bloat refers to the phenomenon where the user interface (UI) becomes unnecessarily complex and overloaded with features, options, or elements that can overwhelm users. This often leads to a cluttered experience, decreased usability, and increased difficulty for users to accomplish their tasks efficiently. Interface bloat can arise from various sources, including the addition of excessive functionality without proper consideration of user needs, the merging of disparate features, or pressure to include numerous options to cater to a broader audience.
