= Strangler fig pattern =

Computer science architectural pattern

In programming, the strangler fig pattern or strangler pattern is an architectural pattern that involves wrapping old code, with the intent of redirecting it to newer code or to log uses of the old code. Coined by Martin Fowler, its name derives from the strangler fig plant, which tends to grow on trees and eventually kill them. It has also been called Ship of Theseus pattern, named after a philosophical paradox.

The pattern can be used at the method level or the class level.

== Rewrites ==
One use of this pattern is during software rewrites. Code can be divided into many small sections, wrapped with the strangler fig pattern, then that section of old code can be swapped out with new code before moving on to the next section. This is less risky and more incremental than swapping out the entire piece of software.

The strangler fig pattern can be used on monolithic applications to migrate them to a microservices architecture.

== Logging ==
Another use of this pattern is the addition of logging to old code. For example, logging can be used to see how frequently the code is used in production, which can be used to decide whether to delete low-usage code, or to rewrite high-usage code.

== See also ==
- List of software architecture styles and patterns
