= Anti-pattern =

Solution to a problem that may be commonly used but is generally a bad choice

An anti-pattern is any common but counterproductive solution to some class of problem. The term, coined in 1995 by Andrew Koenig, was inspired by the book Design Patterns which highlights reliable and effective software development design patterns. Michael Ackroyd described anti-patterns in a paper presented at the 1996 Object World West Conference. The 1998 book AntiPatterns popularized the idea and extended its scope beyond software design to include software architecture and project management. Other authors have extended it further to encompass environmental, organizational, and cultural anti-patterns.

An anti-pattern can be distinguished from a bad habit, bad practice, or bad idea by two traits. First, anti-patterns are commonly used processes, structures or patterns of action that initially appear to be appropriate and effective, but have greater drawbacks than benefits. Second, there is another way to solve the problem that is documented, repeatable, and effective where the anti-pattern is not.

Similar to patterns, a "rule-of-three" applies: to be an anti-pattern it should have occurred at least three times.

Documenting anti-patterns can help to analyze a problem space and to capture expert knowledge. While some anti-pattern descriptions merely document the consequences of the pattern, good anti-pattern documentation also provides alternatives ways to minimize harm.

== Examples ==
=== In software engineering ===
In software engineering, anti-patterns include:

God object
A single class handles all control in a program rather than control being distributed across multiple classes.

Magic number
A literal value with an important yet unexplained meaning which could be replaced with a named constant.

Poltergeist
Ephemeral controller classes that only exist to invoke other methods on classes.

Big Ball of Mud
A software system that lacks a perceivable architecture. Although undesirable from a software engineering point of view, such systems are common in practice due to business pressures, developer turnover and software entropy.

=== In project management ===
Project management anti-patterns included in the Antipatterns book include:

Blowhard Jamboree
An excess of industry pundits

Analysis paralysis

Viewgraph Engineering
Too much time spent making presentations and not enough on the actual software.

Death by Planning
Spending too much effort planning.

Fear of Success
Irrational fears near to project completion.

The Corncob
Difficulties with people.

Intellectual Violence
Intimidation through use of jargon or arcane technology

Irrational Management
Bad management habits.

Smoke and Mirrors
Excessive use of demos and prototypes by salespeople.

Throw It Over the Wall
Forcing fad software engineering practices onto developers without buy-in.

Fire Drill
Long periods of monotony punctuated by short crises.

The Feud
Conflicts between managers.

e-mail Is Dangerous
Situations resulting from ill-advised e-mail messages.

== See also ==
- Capability Immaturity Model
- Code smell – Characteristic of source code that hints at a quality problem
- Dark pattern – Deceptive user interface designs
- Design smell – Term in computer programming
- ISO/IEC 29110: Software Life Cycle Profiles and Guidelines for Very Small Entities (VSEs)
- List of software anti-patterns
- List of software development philosophies
- List of tools for static code analysis
- Software Peter principle – Engineering term for a complex, failing project
- Software rot – Degradation or loss of the use of software over time
- The Innovator's Dilemma – 1997 book by Clayton M. Christensen
