= Rubber duck debugging =

Code debugging method

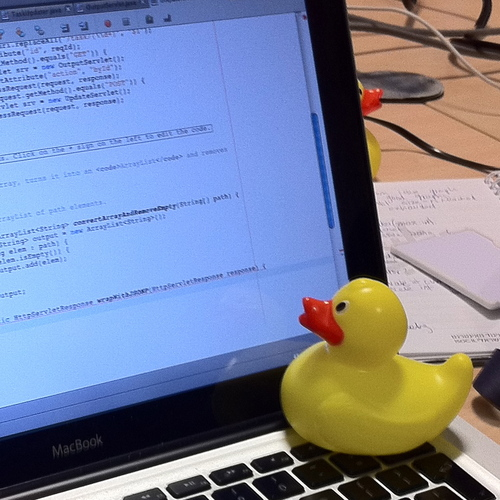
A rubber duck in use by a developer to aid debugging

Rubber duck debugging (or rubberducking) is a debugging technique in software engineering, wherein a programmer explains their code, step by step, in natural language—either aloud or in writing—to reveal mistakes and misunderstandings.

== Origin and definition ==
The name is a reference to an anecdote told in The Pragmatic Programmer by Andy Hunt and Dave Thomas. The book described rubber ducking as the method of explaining a problem to another party who does not "need to say a word; the simple act of explaining, step by step, what the code is supposed to do often causes the problem to leap off the screen and announce itself". The term referred to a research assistant, Greg Pugh, who carried around a rubber duck to which he could address such explanations. Variations of the practice use other objects or even pets; teddy bears are especially common.

== Approach ==
Programmers often discover solutions while explaining a problem to someone else, even to people with no programming knowledge. Describing the code, and comparing to what it actually does, exposes inconsistencies. Explaining a subject also forces the programmer to look at it from new perspectives and can provide a deeper understanding.

The programmer explaining their solution to an inanimate object (such as a rubber duck) has the advantage of not requiring another human, but also works better than thinking aloud without an audience. This approach has been taught in computer science and software engineering courses.

== In popular culture ==
On 1 April 2018, Stack Overflow launched an April Fools' Day joke called Quack Overflow. A rubber duck avatar appeared in the bottom right corner of the screen, listened to user problems, and pretended to type solutions, only to respond with a simple "quack" sound. It referenced rubber ducking as a powerful method for solving problems.

== See also ==
- Code review
- Pair programming
- Socratic method
- Desk checking
- Duck test
- Duck typing
- Software walkthrough
- Eureka effect § The Aha! effect and scientific discovery
- Think aloud protocol
- Pointing and calling
- Rogerian method
- Worry dolls
- Learning by teaching
- Body doubling
