= Sam Ruby =

American computer scientist

- Education: Christopher Newport University (BA)
- Occupation: software developer
- Known for: Atom, Apache

Sam Ruby is a software developer who has made significant contributions to web standards and open source software projects. He has contributed to the standardization of syndicated web feeds via his involvement with the Atom standard and the Feed Validator web service.

He retired from the position of Rails Specialist at Fly.io in October 2025.

== Background ==
Sam Ruby received a B.A. in mathematics from Christopher Newport University, Newport News, Virginia. He formerly worked on open source project development for IBM.

=== Apache Project ===
Ruby is a former board member of the Apache Software Foundation. He formerly served as president; Assistant Secretary; Director, Vice President of Legal Affairs; and was the Chair of the Apache Jakarta Project. He actively contributes to numerous Apache projects. Notably, he was one of the early Ant contributors, as well as being the creator of Gump.

=== Feed Validator ===
Ruby is the principal maintainer of the Feed validator, which he developed along with Mark Pilgrim. Feed Validator is able to validate Atom feeds as well as RSS 0.90, 0.91, 0.92, 0.93, 0.94, 1.0, 1.1 and 2.0 feeds.

=== PHP ===
Ruby also contributed to PHP, in particular to the Java Extension.

=== Ruby ===
Sam Ruby has done development in the Ruby programming language, leading to some confusion between his name and the language. However, there is no formal connection—they both just coincidentally have the same name.

=== Venus ===
Ruby is the author of Venus, an Atom/RSS feed aggregator, the codebase that began as a refactoring of the Planet 2.0 feed aggregator in 2006.

=== html5lib ===
Ruby is a developer member of the html5lib project, with his primary contribution being the initial port of html5lib to the Ruby programming language.

== Standardization efforts ==
Ruby has been active within various standards development organizations.

=== ECMA standardization of the .NET Framework CLI ===
Ruby was the convener of the ECMA TC49 group that standardized the Common Language Infrastructure for Microsoft's .NET Framework.

=== Atom ===
The project which eventually became the Atom web feed standard was started by a blog posting by Sam Ruby in 2002 entitled "what makes a log entry". This blog posting eventually became a wiki project which acted as a rallying point for people looking to improve upon the frozen RSS format. Sam Ruby was the secretary of the IETF AtomPub working group. This working group completed RFC 4287, the Atom format specification ("The Atom Syndication Format"), in December 2005 and RFC 5023, "The Atom Publishing Protocol", in October 2007.

=== ECMAScript ===
Ruby is a member of the ECMAScript technical committee (ECMAScript TC39); his primary contribution to the group is in driving the effort to add Decimal support to ECMAScript.

=== HTML5 ===
Ruby was an early adopter of HTML5, and has offered a number of concrete proposals which were subsequently incorporated into the HTML5 draft. He was appointed as the co-chair of the W3C's HTML Working Group on 5 January 2009.

== Bibliography ==
- Agile Web Development with Rails 5 (Pragmatic Bookshelf, 2016) (with Dave Thomas and David Heinemeier Hansson) ISBN 978-1-68050-171-1
- Agile Web Development with Rails 4 (Pragmatic Bookshelf, 2013) (with Dave Thomas and David Heinemeier Hansson) ISBN 1-937-78556-4
- RESTful Web APIs (O'Reilly Publishing, 2013) ISBN 1-449-35806-3
- Agile Web Development with Rails 3.2 (Pragmatic Bookshelf, 2011) (with Dave Thomas and David Heinemeier Hansson) ISBN 1-934-35654-9
- Agile Web Development with Rails, Third Edition (Pragmatic Bookshelf, 2009) (with Dave Thomas and David Heinemeier Hansson) ISBN 1-934-35616-6
- RESTful Web Services (O'Reilly Publishing, 2007) ISBN 0-596-52926-0

== See also ==
- Apache Software Foundation
- Atom (standard)
