= Flaunt Kit =

Flaunt Kit.
- Company type: Private
- Industry: Telecommunications software and services, web conferencing and collaboration tool
- Founded: October 2010
- Headquarters: Umeå (Sweden)
- Key people: Anders Gunnarsson (Chief Executive Officer)
- Products: Flaunt Kit; Flaunt Kit Video
- Number of employees: ~2 (May 2011)
- Website: http://www.flauntkit.com

Flaunt Kit. is a provider of Internet and mobile based collaboration and meeting tools.

Founded in 2010, Flaunt Kit is a private company based in Umeå, Sweden.

== Products and services ==
=== Flaunt Kit ===
Flaunt Kit is an online meeting, video conferencing and collaboration tool developed mainly for the web, design and photography industry. Flaunt Kit enables the attendees to discuss Pdf, Jpg and Png files in realtime. All attendees are able to point at details in the images as all mouse pointers are visible in real time. The tool integrates with Skype, 37 Signals's Basecamp and YouTube making it part of the cloud. Flaunt Kit is the first web tool to support synchronized YouTube playback during a meeting.

=== Flaunt Kit Video ===
A collaboration tool for video producers. This tool is still under development and is expected to be released during June, 2011.
