= Omarchy =

Arch Linux-based Linux distribution

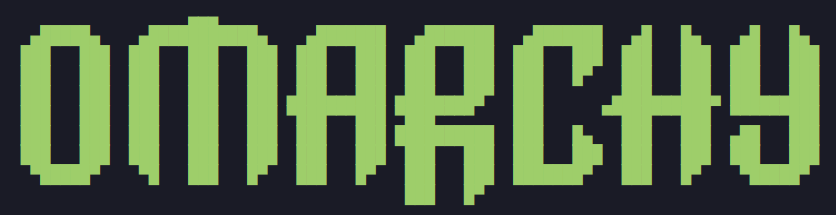

- Omarchy running on Try Omarchy
- Developer: David Heinemeier Hansson; Ryan Hughes
- OS family: Linux
- Source model: Open source
- Initial release: June 26, 2025; 16 months ago
- Latest release: 4.5.0 / 5 November 2026; 16 days ago
- Repository: github.com/omacom/omarchy
- Package manager: pacman
- Kernel type: Monolithic (Linux)
- Default user interface: Hyprland; Quickshell
- License: MIT License
- Official website: omarchy.org

Omarchy is an open-source Linux distribution created by David Heinemeier Hansson. It is an opinionated distro made for onboarding Windows and Mac users unfamiliar with the Linux environment. It is based on Arch Linux and uses the Hyprland tiling Wayland compositor and Quickshell desktop shell.

== History ==
Hansson released Omarchy on June 26, 2025, describing it as an opinionated configuration of Arch Linux and Hyprland intended primarily as a developer environment. The project subsequently developed from a post-installation configuration into a Linux distribution with its own installation image and package repository.

Omarchy 3.7, released in May 2026, introduced a unified command-line interface and expanded gaming support. Version 4.0 was released in August 2026 and replaced several separate desktop components with a shell built using Quickshell.

=== Funding and controversy ===
In August 2026, Hansson incorporated the Omacom Foundation as a nonprofit to support Omarchy's development, with commitments by 1Password and 37signals to donate $300,000 each, and an additional $12 million in funding from 12 individuals:

- Tobias Lütke, CEO of Shopify
- Patrick Collison, CEO of Stripe
- Michael Dell, Chairman and CEO of Dell Technologies
- Jack Dorsey, Head of Block
- Matthew Prince, CEO of Cloudflare
- Brendan Iribe, cofounder of Scaleform and Oculus VR
- Jason Fried, CEO of 37signals
- Drew Houston, cofounder and co-CEO of Dropbox
- Peter Steinberger, creator of OpenClaw
- Brian Armstrong, CEO of Coinbase
- Yunjie Dai, cofounder of TapTap
- Hansson himself

1Password was met with backlash after their donation from both customers and employees due to Hansson's right-wing views on immigration, including a blog post which called for the deportation of Romani people in Europe, comparing this to the shooting of wolves. In September 2026, DigitalOcean announced a $3 million commitment to fund the foundation.

Omarchy's doctrine frames the project as a call to unite contributors behind making Linux succeed on the desktop, rejects codes of conduct and what it calls "identity-overload nonsense" in favor of being "nice and sincere", treats computing heritage as a duty, and describes its governance as a "benevolent dictatorship in the grand tradition of Linux, Ruby, and Rails" rather than a democracy.

== Features ==
Omarchy provides a preconfigured desktop environment centered on keyboard-driven workflows and tiling window management. It includes development tools, AI coding agents, terminal applications, web browsers and desktop software, with system configuration and applications accessible through a unified interface.

The distribution uses Arch Linux as its base, Hyprland as its Wayland compositor, and Quickshell for its status bar, launcher, notifications and other desktop components. Omarchy uses shell scripts for much of its system tooling, while its desktop shell is implemented in QML using Quickshell.

Omarchy ships with a selection of preinstalled software, including Neovim, Chromium, Obsidian, LibreOffice, Kdenlive and OBS Studio.

== Reception ==
Omarchy's reception has been controversial. Some critics have accused the project of normalizing what they describe as fascism in the FOSS community. Another criticism levied against the project is that it does not meaningfully build upon its base Linux distribution, as it consists mostly of configuration for existing open source software.

Matthew Garrett made a social media post where he stated that Omarchy is "fundamentally incompatible" with the goals of free software.

== See also ==
- List of Linux distributions
