= David Heinemeier Hansson =

Programmer, racing driver, creator of Ruby on Rails

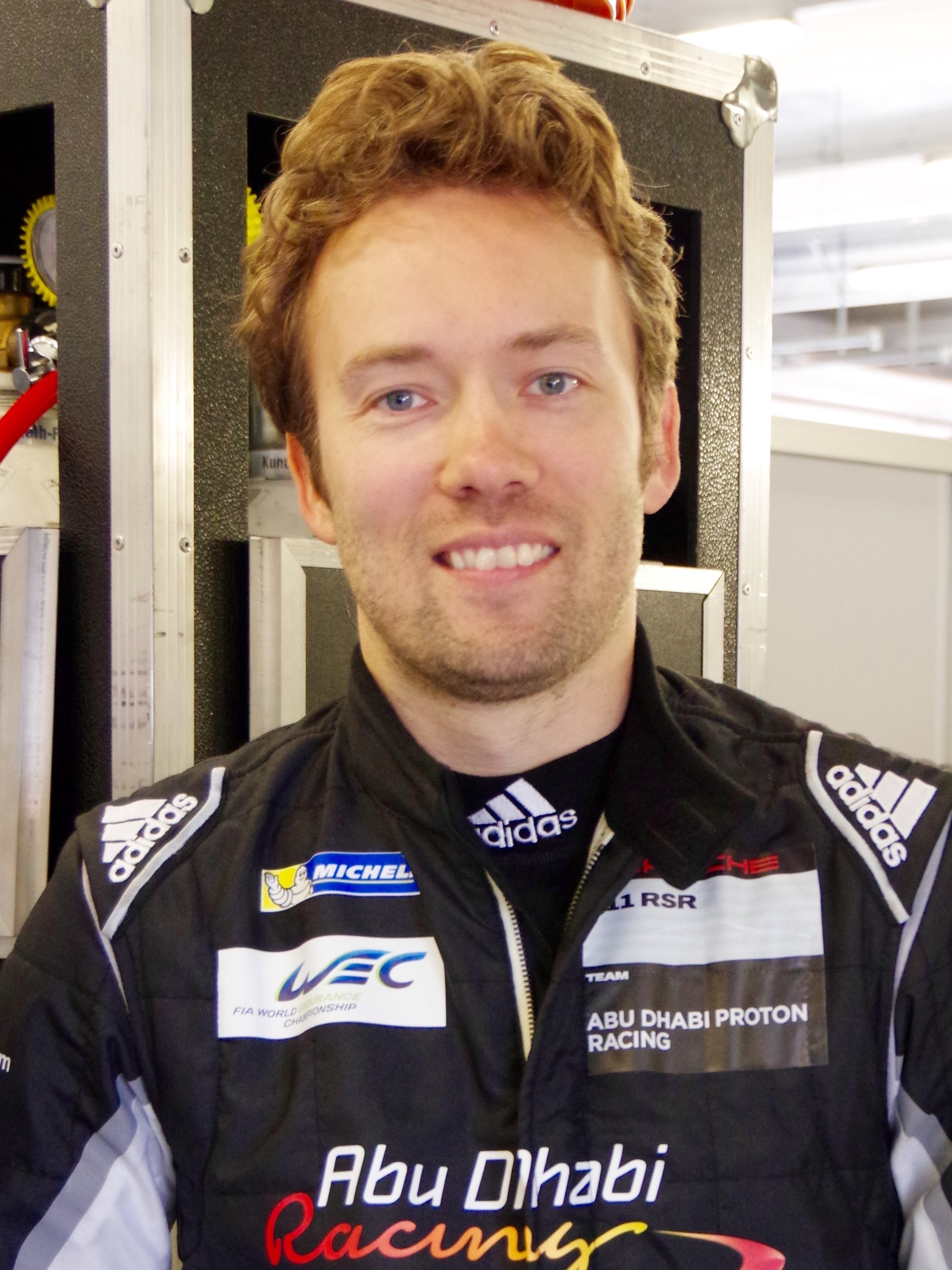
- Hansson in 2016
- Born: 15 October 1979 (age 47); Copenhagen, Denmark
- Other name: DHH
- Employer: 37signals
- Known for: Ruby on Rails; Omarchy
- Website: dhh.dk

David Heinemeier Hansson, also known by his initials DHH, is a Danish programmer, writer, entrepreneur, and racing driver. He is the creator of Ruby on Rails, a web framework written in Ruby. He also created Omarchy, an Arch Linux distribution catered towards developers. He is also a partner and chief technology officer at the web-based software development firm 37signals.

Hansson co-wrote Agile Web Development with Rails with Dave Thomas in 2005 as part of The Facets of Ruby Series. He also co-wrote Getting Real: The Smarter, Faster Easier Way to build a Web Application, Rework, Remote: Office Not Required, and It Doesn't Have to Be Crazy at Work with Jason Fried.

Hansson has come under controversy for publishing racist remarks on his blog.

== Programming career ==
Hansson learned PHP in high school while creating gaming review sites. Although he initially did not intend to become a programmer, his interest in expanding his sites' features led him to pursue programming professionally. In 1999, Hansson founded and built a Danish online gaming news website and community called Daily Rush, which he ran until 2001. After attracting the attention of Jason Fried by offering him help with PHP coding, Hansson was hired by Fried to build a web-based project management tool, which ultimately became 37signals' Basecamp software as a service product. To aid the development process, Hansson used the then-relatively obscure Ruby programming language to develop a custom web framework. He released the framework separately from the project management tool in 2004 as the open source project Ruby on Rails. In 2005, Hansson was recognized by Google and O'Reilly with the "Hacker of the Year" award for his creation of Ruby on Rails. After graduating from the Copenhagen Business School and receiving his bachelor's degree in Computer Science and Business Administration, Hansson moved from Denmark to Chicago, Illinois, U.S. in November 2005.

== Racing career ==
David Heinemeier Hansson
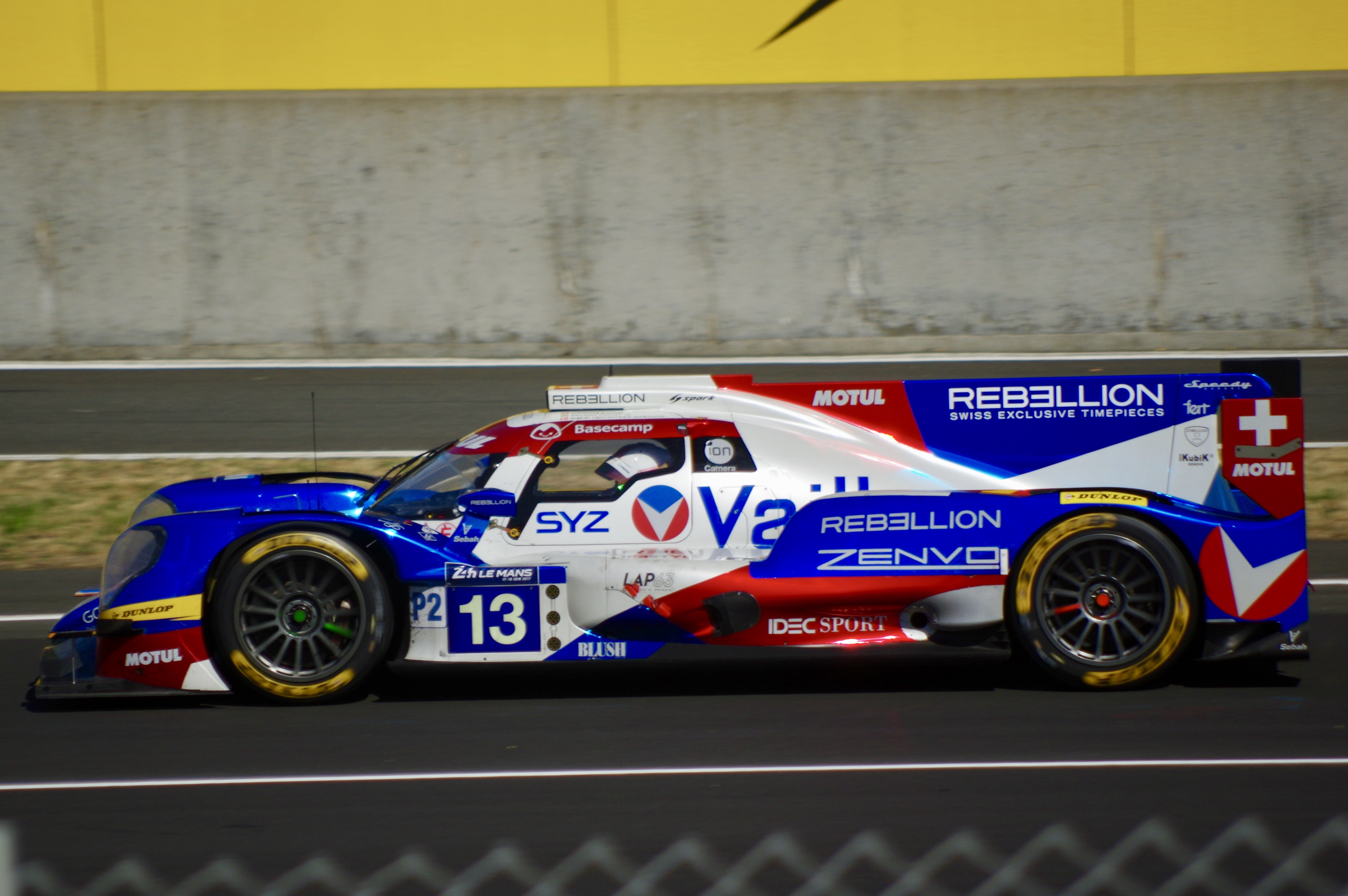
- DHH racing for Rebellion in 2017
- Nationality: (Denmark) Danish
- Categorisation: FIA Bronze (2011–2012); FIA Silver (2013–)

24 Hours of Le Mans career
- Years: 2012 -
- Teams: OAK Racing, Aston Martin Racing, Extreme Speed Motorsports, Proton Competition, Rebellion Racing
- Best finish: 8th (2013)
- Class wins: 1

Heinemeier Hansson lists photography and race car driving amongst his many hobbies. He took part in the 2012 24 Hours of Le Mans driving for OAK Racing. He also drove a Morgan-Nissan P2 car for Conquest Racing in the American Le Mans Series (ALMS), winning two races in the season. Heinemeier Hansson joined OAK Racing full-time in 2013, taking five second-place finishes to finish second in the Trophy for LMP2 Drivers. During the 2017 24 Hours of Le Mans post-race technical checks, certain irregularities were detected on the Vaillante Rebellion team's No. 13 Oreca 07-Gibson, resulting in the car's disqualification.

In July 2010, it was revealed that Heinemeier Hansson was the person that had commissioned the one-off Pagani Zonda HH supercar. He also commissioned the Koenigsegg Agera HH, which was sold in 2022 to Houston Crosta, a YouTube video creator in Las Vegas. It has now been sold to car spotting YouTuber, TheStradman. Heinemeier Hansson also purchased an Aston Martin Valkyrie.

=== 24 Hours of Le Mans results ===
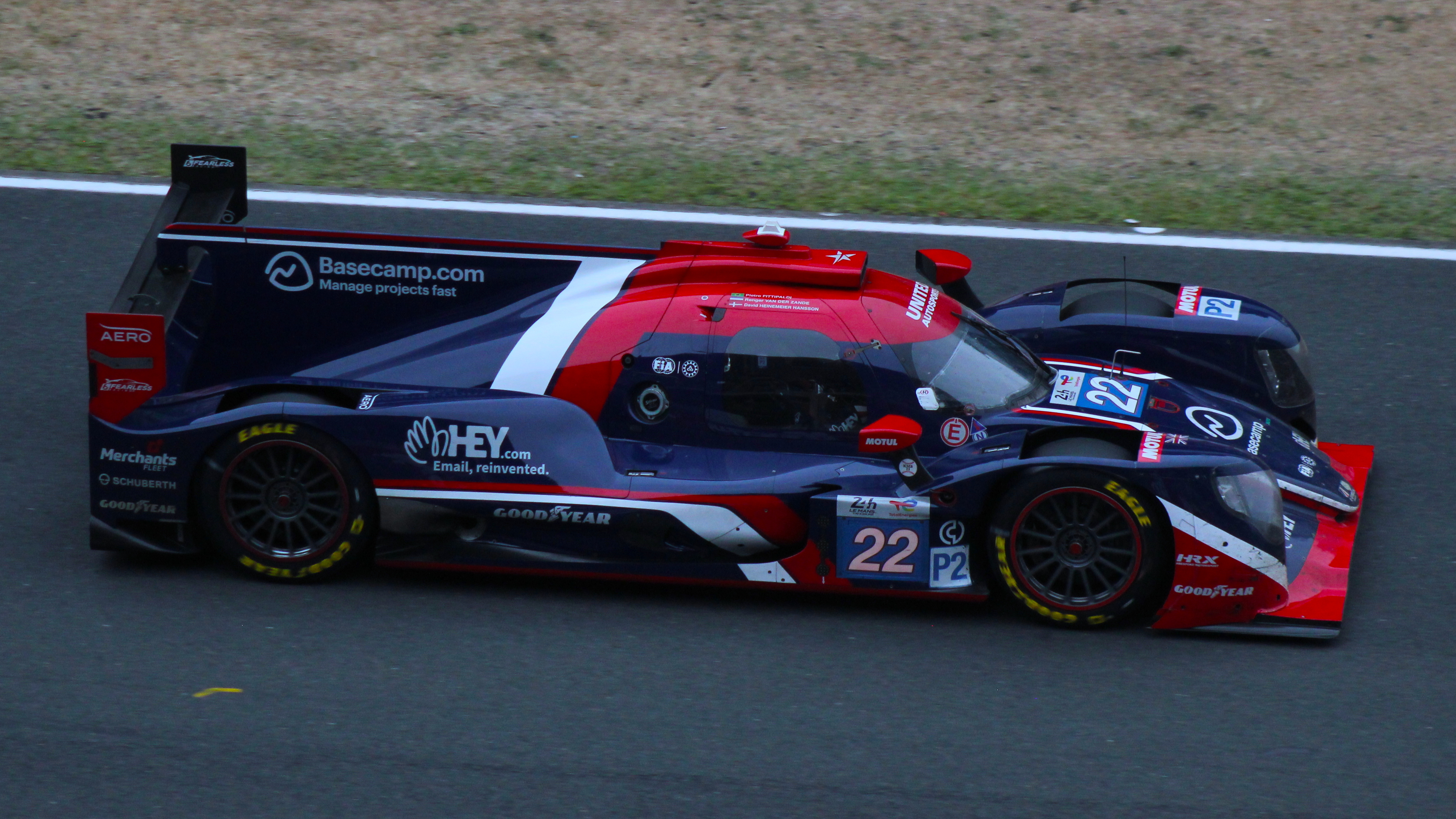
Heinemeier Hansson's No. 22 car at the 2025 24 Hours of Le Mans

Year	Team	Co-Drivers	Car	Class	Laps	Pos.	Class Pos.
2012	(France) OAK Racing	(Belgium) Bas Leinders (Belgium) Maxime Martin	Morgan LMP2-Nissan	LMP2	341	14th	7th
2013	(France) OAK Racing	(France) Olivier Pla (United Kingdom) Alex Brundle	Morgan LMP2-Nissan	LMP2	328	8th	**2nd**
2014	(United Kingdom) Aston Martin Racing	(Denmark) Kristian Poulsen (Denmark) Nicki Thiim	Aston Martin Vantage GTE	GTE; Am	334	17th	**1st**
2015	(United States) Extreme Speed Motorsports	(United States) Scott Sharp (United Kingdom) Ryan Dalziel	Ligier JS P2-Honda	LMP2	329	28th	10th
2016	(Germany) Abu Dhabi-Proton Racing	(United Arab Emirates) Khaled Al Qubaisi (United States) Patrick Long	Porsche 911 RSR	GTE; Am	330	28th	**3rd**
2017	(Switzerland) Vaillante Rebellion	(Brazil) Nelson Piquet Jr. (Switzerland) Mathias Beche	Oreca 07-Gibson	LMP2	364	DSQ	DSQ
2018	(China) Jackie Chan DC Racing	(United States) Ricky Taylor (France) Côme Ledogar	Ligier JS P217-Gibson	LMP2	195	DNF	DNF
2019	(China) Jackie Chan DC Racing	(United States) Ricky Taylor (United Kingdom) Jordan King	Oreca 07-Gibson	LMP2	199	DNF	DNF
2022	(Poland) Inter Europol Competition	(Brazil) Pietro Fittipaldi (Switzerland) Fabio Scherer	Oreca 07-Gibson	LMP2	364	18th	14th
2023	(United Kingdom) Jota Sport	(Brazil) Pietro Fittipaldi (Denmark) Oliver Rasmussen	Oreca 07-Gibson	LMP2	316	24th	13th
2024	(United Kingdom) Nielsen Racing	(Switzerland) Fabio Scherer (Cayman Islands) Kyffin Simpson	Oreca 07-Gibson	LMP2	291	25th	11th
2025	(United Kingdom) United Autosports	(Brazil) Pietro Fittipaldi (Netherlands) Renger van der Zande	Oreca 07-Gibson	LMP2	364	24th	7th
2026	(United Kingdom) Nielsen Racing	(Australia) Jack Doohan (United Kingdom) Edward Pearson	Oreca 07-Gibson	LMP2	341	32nd	18th

=== Complete FIA World Endurance Championship results ===
Year	Entrant	Class	Car	Engine	1	2	3	4	5	6	7	8	9	Rank	Points
2013	OAK Racing	LMP2	Morgan LMP2	Nissan VK45DE 4.5 L V8	SIL; 2	SPA; 2	**LMS**; 2	SÃO; 6	COA; 6	FUJ; 3	SHA; 2	BHR; 2		2nd	132.5
2014	Aston Martin Racing	LMGTE Am	Aston Martin Vantage V8 GTE	Aston Martin 4.5 L V8	SIL; 1	SPA; 2	**LMS**; 1	COA; 2	FUJ; 1	SHA; 2	BHR; 1	SÃO; 2		1st	198
2015	Extreme Speed Motorsports	LMP2	HPD ARX-03b Ligier JS P2	Honda HR28TT 2.8 L Turbo V6	SIL	SPA; 8	**LMS**; 5	NÜR; 6	COA; 4	FUJ; 4	SHA; Ret	BHR; 7		7th	62
2016	Abu Dhabi-Proton Racing	LMGTE Am	Porsche 911 RSR	Porsche 4.0 L Flat-6	SIL; 5	SPA; 6	**LMS**; 2	NÜR; 4	MEX; 1	COA; 5	FUJ; 5	SHA; 4	BHR; 1	2nd	151
2017	Vaillante Rebellion	LMP2	Oreca 07	Gibson GK-428 4.2 litre V8	SIL; 9	SPA; 4	**LMS**; DSQ	NÜR; 4	MEX; 5	COA; 2	FUJ; DSQ	SHA; 3	BHR; 3	8th	85
2018–19	Jackie Chan DC Racing	LMP2	Oreca 07	Gibson GK428 4.2 L V8	SPA	LMS	SIL	FUJ	SHA	SEB; 1	SPA; 6	LMS; Ret		11th	40
2019-20	Team Project 1	LMGTE AM	Porsche 911 RSR	Porsche 4.0L Flat 6	SIL	FUJ; 7	**SHA**; 5	BHR; 9	COA	SPA	LMS	BHR		23rd	20
2022	Inter Europol Competition	LMP2	Oreca 07	Gibson GK428 4.2 L V8	SEB	SPA	LMS; 14	MNZ	FUJ	BHR				NC†	0
2023	Jota	LMP2	Oreca 07	Gibson GK428 4.2 L V8	SEB; 5	PRT; 7	SPA; 9	LMS; 13	MNZ; 1	FUJ; 6	BHR; 3			6th	84

^{†} As Heinemeier Hansson was a guest driver, he was ineligible for points.

=== Complete European Le Mans Series results ===
(Races in bold indicate pole position; results in italics indicate fastest lap)

Year	Entrant	Class	Chassis	Engine	1	2	3	4	5	6	Rank	Points
2011	Lotus Jetalliance	GTE Pro	Lotus Evora GTE	Toyota-Cosworth 4.0 L V6	CAS	SPA	IMO	SIL; NC	EST		NC	0
2013	Jota Sport	LMP2	Zytek Z11SN	Nissan VK45DE 4.5 L V8	SIL	IMO; 5	RBR	HUN	LEC		17th	10
2019	Team Project 1	LMGTE	Porsche 911 RSR	Porsche 4.0 L Flat-6	LEC	MNZ	CAT; 5	SIL	SPA	ALG	17th	10
2022	Inter Europol Competition	LMP2	Oreca 07	Gibson GK428 4.2 L V8	LEC; 11	IMO; 9	MNZ; 11	CAT; 16	SPA; 2	ALG; 4	10th	32
2024	Nielsen Racing	LMP2	Oreca 07	Gibson GK428 4.2 L V8	CAT; 13	LEC; 11	IMO; 12	SPA; 13	MUG	ALG	24th	0

^{*} Season still in progress.

=== WeatherTech SportsCar Championship results ===
(Races in bold indicate pole position, Results are overall/class)

Year	Team	Class	Car	Engine	1	2	3	4	5	6	7	8	9	10	11	Rank	Points	Ref
2014	RSR Racing	PC	Oreca FLM09	Chevrolet LS3 6.2 L V8	DAY; 9	**SEB**; 2	LGA	KAN	WGL	IMS	ELK	VIR	AUS	ATL; 9		24th	57	
2015	Tequila Patrón ESM	P	HPD ARX-04b 1 HPD ARX-03b 2	Honda HR28TT 2.8 L V6 Turbo	DAY; 10	SIR; 9	LBH	LS	DET	S6H	MSP	ELK	COA	PET		21st	45	
2016	Starworks Motorsport	PC	Oreca FLM09	Chevrolet LS3 6.2 L V8	DAY	SEB; 3	LBH	LGA	DET	WGL	MOS	LIM	ELK	COA	PET; 6	20th	57	
2018	3GT Racing	GTD	Lexus RC F GT3	Lexus 5.0 L V8	DAY; 9	SEB; 5	**MDO**; 4	DET; 12	**WGL**; 4	MOS; 7	LIM	ELK; 12	**VIR**; 8	LGA; 7	PET; 10	11th	213	
2020	Tower Motorsport by Starworks	LMP2	Oreca 07	Gibson GK428 4.2 L V8	DAY; 4†	SEB	ELK	ATL	PET	LGA	SEB; 2					18th	32	
2025	Era Motorsport	LMP2	Oreca 07	Gibson GK428 4.2 L V8	DAY; 4	SEB; 12	WGL; 4	MOS	ELK	IMS; 12	ATL; 3					24th	1362	
2026	TDS Racing	LMP2	Oreca 07	Gibson GK428 4.2 L V8	DAY; 12	SEB; 7	WGL; 10	MOS	ELK; 3	IMS	PET; 11					22nd	1264	

^{†} Points only counted towards the Michelin Endurance Cup, and not the overall LMP2 Championship.

== Recognition ==
- 2005: Won Best Hacker of the Year 2005 at OSCON from Google and O'Reilly for the work on Rails.
- 2006: Accepted the Jolt Award of product excellence for Rails 1.0.
- 2012: Named ALMS Rookie of the year.

== Controversy ==
Following a number of controversial decisions at Basecamp led by Hansson, including the 2021 banning of political discussion and an internal list of "funny" customer names with racial and ethnic overtones as well as later blog posts published by Hansson himself such as his criticisms of DEI programs, Duke University Libraries announced its decision in 2023 to discontinue usage of the Basecamp product.

In 2025, Hansson published a blog post expressing support for far-right British activist Tommy Robinson and the 2025 British anti-immigration protests, as well as mourning that London is "no longer full of native Brits".

Hansson published another blog post in July of 2026 comparing the Romani population of Copenhagen to Denmark's struggles with its wolf population growth, stating that "When wolves get out of control, you shoot them. When gypsies take over public spaces, you deport them."

In September 2026, 1Password announced that they would contribute $300,000 towards the nonprofit foundation of Hansson's new Linux distribution, Omarchy. The decision drew criticism from 1Password customers and employees. In an internal message to staff, CEO David Faugno stated that the contribution was directed to the Omacom Foundation rather than to an individual and did not constitute an endorsement of Hansson's personal views, while noting that Omarchy had become the second most-used Linux distribution among 1Password customers.

== Personal life ==
Through Yvonne Tuxen, his great-great-grandfather is the painter Laurits Tuxen.

== Written works ==
- Agile Web Development with Rails 5 (Pragmatic Bookshelf, 2016) (with Sam Ruby and Dave Thomas) ISBN 978-1-68050-171-1
- Rework
- It Doesn't Have to Be Crazy at Work
- Remote: Office Not Required
- The Rails Doctrine

Sporting positions
Preceded by Jamie Campbell-Walter; Stuart Hall	FIA Endurance Trophy for LMGTE Am Drivers; 2014 with: Kristian Poulsen	Succeeded by Aleksey Basov; Andrea Bertolini; Viktor Shaitar
