= Programming Ruby =

- Author: Dave Thomas, Chad Fowler, Andrew Hunt
- Publisher: Pragmatic Programmers
- Publication date: 22 October 2004 (second edition)
- Publication place: United States
- Media type: Print (Paperback)
- Pages: 864 pages (second edition)
- ISBN: 0-9745140-5-5
- OCLC: 254803547
- Dewey Decimal: 005.133 22
- LC Class: QA76.64 .T494 2005

Programming Ruby is a book about the Ruby programming language by Dave Thomas and Andrew Hunt, authors of The Pragmatic Programmer. In the Ruby community, it is commonly known as "The PickAxe" because of the pickaxe on the cover. The book has helped Ruby to spread outside Japan.

The complete first edition of this book is freely available under the Open Publication License v1.0, and was published by Addison-Wesley in 2001. The second edition, covering the features of Ruby 1.8, was published by The Pragmatic Programmers, LLC in 2004. The third edition, covering Ruby 1.9, was published in 2010, with the fourth edition, covering Ruby 1.9 and 2.0 being published in 2013.

A fifth edition, updated for Ruby 3.3, was written by Noel Rappin, and published by Pragmatic Programmers, LLC in 2023.
