= Sandi Metz =

American software engineer, author

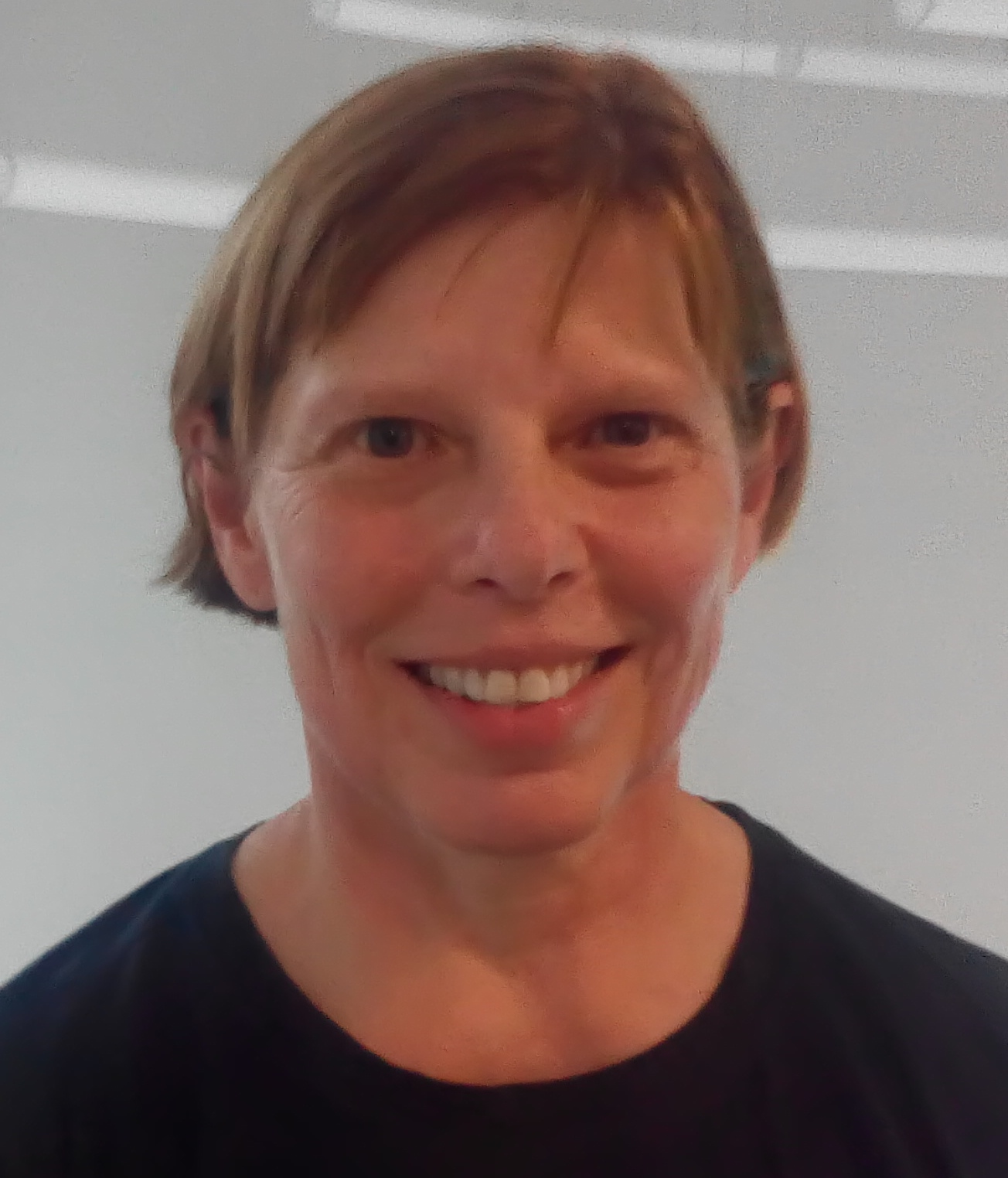
- Occupations: Software engineer; author
- Employer: Duke University
- Website: sandimetz.com

Sandi Metz is an American software engineer and author. She is the author of Practical Object-Oriented Design in Ruby. Metz teaches workshops around the United States for new and experienced developers, emphasizing good programming habits and practices.

Metz is known for her books and articles on object-oriented programming and her statement regarding abstraction and the Don't repeat yourself principle, that duplication is cheaper than the wrong abstraction.

== Publications ==
- Metz, Sandi (September 5, 2012), Practical Object-Oriented Design in Ruby (First ed.), Addison-Wesley, ISBN 0-321-72133-0
- Metz, Sandi & Owen, Katrina (Mar 20, 2017), 99 Bottles of OOP (First ed.), Potato Canyon Software, LLC, ISBN 1-944823-00-X

== Important concepts elaborated ==
- SOLID Design principles
- Test-driven development
- Dependency injection
