= Hyprland =

Compositing window manager

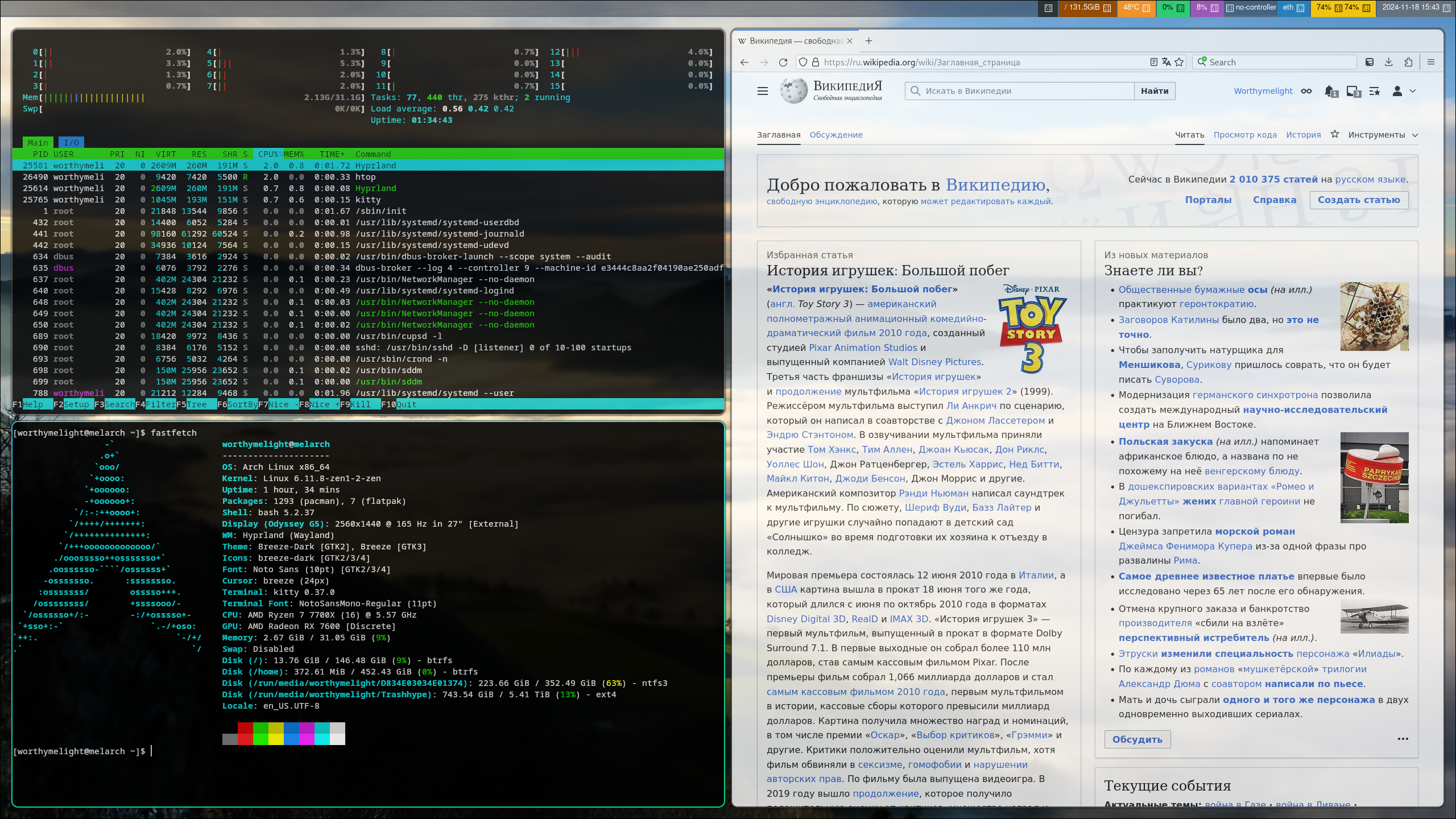
- Original author: Vaxry
- Release: 27 May 2022; 4 years ago
- Stable release: 0.57.2 / 9 November 2026; 11 days ago
- Written in: C++
- Operating system: Unix-like
- Type: Wayland compositor
- License: BSD 3-Clause
- Website: hypr.land
- Repository: github.com/hyprwm/Hyprland

Hyprland is a dynamic tiling window manager and compositing manager for Wayland written in C++. Hyprland officially supports Arch Linux and NixOS, with unofficial support for other Linux distributions like Fedora and Gentoo.

In 2026, Hyprland received an exclusive three-years sponsorship from the Omacom foundation.

== Features ==
Hyprland includes support for dynamic tiling, tabbed windows and a custom renderer providing window animations and support for rounded corners using the Dual-Kawase blur technique when rendering transparent windows, among other rendering capabilities. It additionally features extensive configurability and extensibility through a Lua-based configuration system that was added in the 0.55 release. Before 0.55, Hyprland used a configuration language called hyprlang with the primary configuration being stored in ~/.config/hypr/hyprland.conf.

Hyprland is keyboard centric, primarily making use of keyboard shortcuts to perform actions. The default installation of Hyprland comes with no panels or docks, and consists primarily of a black screen with a prompt to a few shortcuts to get a user started. The user can then modify the existing auto-generated config to customize the window manager to their workflow. Roine Bertelson from MakeUseOf noted that Hyprland was not for everyone especially if they wanted everything configured out of the box, but rather the customizability allowed for each user to define their own settings and shortcuts allowing users to configure their desktops to suit their workflows.

== Controversies ==
In 2024, the lead developer of Hyprland was banned from Freedesktop.org by its Code of Conduct team over a pattern of the Hyprland Discord server enabling harassment of transgender community members.

In 2025, Framework Computer sponsored the Hyprland and Omarchy project, for which it received criticism due to claims that the Hyprland community may be toxic.

== Reception ==
Hyprland has been praised for its customizability, and is the default window manager of Omarchy, a Linux distribution built on top of Arch Linux.

== See also ==
- List of display servers § Wayland
