= Hey (email service) =

Email service

HEY is a premium email service launched by 37signals in June 2020.

== Service ==
The service may be accessed through the HEY website and through apps for macOS, Windows, Linux, Android and iOS. Due to the service's vertical integration, a HEY mailbox cannot be incorporated into other email services or stand-alone email clients.

Around the time of HEY's launch, a stand-off between 37signals and Apple Inc. over Apple's policy on in-app purchases in apps hosted by its App Store was the cause of significant media attention upon Apple's policies.

== Features ==
- An email from a new sender requires the user to confirm whether they wish to receive emails from that sender, and if not then emails from that sender are never shown again
- Blocks tracking pixels (called a spy tracker in the apps) and informs the user if an email includes tracking
- A single place showing all attachments that have been received, regardless of sender

== See also ==
- Mailbox provider
