= KISS principle =

Design principle preferring simplicity

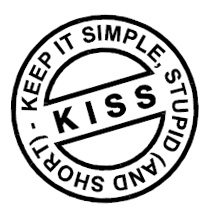

KISS ("Keep it simple, stupid") is a design principle first noted by the U.S. Navy in 1960. First seen partly in American English by at least 1938, KISS implies that simplicity should be a design goal. The phrase has been associated with aircraft engineer Kelly Johnson. The term "KISS principle" was in popular use by 1970. Variations on the phrase (usually as some euphemism for the more churlish "stupid") include "keep it simple, silly", "keep it simple and straightforward", "keep it simple, soldier", and "keep it simple, sweetie".

== Origin ==
The acronym "Keep it simple, stupid" was reportedly coined by Kelly Johnson, lead engineer at the Lockheed Skunk Works (creators of the Lockheed U-2 and SR-71 Blackbird spy planes, among many others). However, the variant "Keep it Short and Simple" is attested from a 1938 issue of the Minneapolis Star.

While popular usage has transcribed it for decades as "Keep it simple, stupid", Johnson transcribed it simply as "Keep it simple stupid" (no comma), and this reading is still used by many authors.

The principle is best exemplified by the story of Johnson handing a team of design engineers a handful of tools, with the challenge that the jet aircraft they were designing must be repairable by an average mechanic in the field under combat conditions with only these tools. Hence, the "stupid" refers to the relationship between the way things break and the sophistication available to repair them.

The acronym has been used by many in the U.S. military, especially the U.S. Navy and United States Air Force, and in the field of software development.

== Variants ==
The principle most probably finds its origins in similar minimalist concepts, such as:

- Occam's razor;
- "Simplicity is the ultimate sophistication";
- Shakespeare's "Brevity is the soul of wit";
- Mies van der Rohe's "Less is more";
- Bjarne Stroustrup's "Make Simple Tasks Simple!";
- Dr. Seuss's ode to brevity: "So the writer who breeds more words than he needs, is making a chore for the reader who reads";
- Johan Cruyff's "Playing football is very simple but playing simple football is the hardest thing there is";
- Antoine de Saint-Exupéry's "It seems that perfection is reached not when there is nothing left to add, but when there is nothing left to take away";
- Colin Chapman, the founder of Lotus Cars, urged his designers to "Simplify, then add lightness";
- Attributed to Albert Einstein, although this may be an editor's paraphrase of a lecture he gave, "Make everything as simple as possible, but not simpler";
- Steve Jobs's "~~Simplify~~, ~~Simplify~~, Simplify", which simplified Henry David Thoreau's quote "Simplify, simplify, simplify" for emphasis;
- Northcote Parkinson, British academic and sometimes military officer and military critic, expressed this idea as "Parkinson's Third Law" (c. 1957): "Expansion means complexity and complexity, decay; or to put it even more plainly—the more complex, the sooner dead";

Heath Robinson contraptions and Rube Goldberg's machines, intentionally overly-complex solutions to simple tasks or problems, are humorous examples of "non-KISS" solutions.

== Usage ==
=== In film animation ===
Master animator Richard Williams explains the KISS principle in his book The Animator's Survival Kit, and Disney's Nine Old Men write about it in Disney Animation: The Illusion of Life, a considerable work of the genre. The problem faced is that inexperienced animators may "over-animate" in their works; that is, a character may move too much and do too much. Williams urges animators to "KISS".

=== In software development ===
- Don't repeat yourself (DRY)
- Minimalism
- Unix philosophy
- Arch Linux
- Slackware Linux
- Chartjunk
- List of software development philosophies
- Reduced instruction set computing
- Rule of least power
- There's more than one way to do it
- Worse is better (Less is more)
- You aren't gonna need it (YAGNI)

=== In politics ===
- Keep It Simple Solutions, New Brunswick, a minor political party in New Brunswick, Canada
- Keep It Straight and Simple Party, a minor political party in South Africa

=== In popular culture ===
In the Filipino neo-noir film Segurista, KISS is invoked by Mrs Librada (played by Liza Lorena) as an approach to selling insurance.

In the American version of The Office, Michael Scott's advice to Dwight Schrute before making any decision is KISS (Keep it Simple, Stupid).

== See also ==
- BLUF (communication)
- Concision
- Elegance
- Grice's maxims
- The Fox and the Cat (fable)
- It's the economy, stupid
- Mini survival kit
- Muntzing
- Perfect is the enemy of good
- Simple living
- Ultralight backpacking
