= TheStradman =

American YouTuber

- Born: James Lucas Condon; 7 May 1989 (age 37); Park City, Utah, U.S
- Occupation: YouTuber
- Partner: Sophia Garcia de Leon (2022-present)

YouTube information
- Channel: TheStradman
- Years active: 2012–present
- Genre: Automobiles
- Subscribers: 4.56 million (TheStradman); 402 thousand (STRAD)
- Views: 1.2 billion (TheStradman); 12.4 million (STRAD)
- Last updated: 1 September 2026
- Website: thestradman.com

James Lucas Condon (born May 7, 1989), better known as The Stradman, is an American YouTuber and entrepreneur. He makes vlog content heavily surrounding his life and Supercar collection. He rose to prominence in the mid-2010s for his mix between car related and general vlog content, unlike many of his predecessors in the scene, who for the most part focused exclusively on the automotive element.

In 2025, he opened Strad Pizza, a New York-style Pizza restaurant in Scottsdale, Arizona.

== Early life ==
James Lucas Condon was born in Park City, Utah on May 7th, 1989. His parents are known through his channel, however Condon has left their identity unknown for privacy reasons. Despite this, it is known his mother currently lives in Oregon, and his father passed away on May 6th, 2021, and is remembered through his son's content, predominantly in his Liberty Walk Lamborghini Aventador, of which he finished hours prior to his fathers passing and holds the vanity plate DADSV12. He is the youngest of four sons.

== Career ==
Condon created his YouTube channel in 2012, using it as a place to share his carspotting adventures, travelling around the United States in his Audi TT (of which he lived in for a time), to document cars and related events such as the Gumball 3000. Condon's career saw a massive boost in July of 2014 after posting his video: Bugatti Veyron Super Sport hits 246.4 MPH!!, which received over 1 million views in the first 24 hours, which showed that YouTube had potential as a career path.

His channel is named after his dream car, the Ferrari 360 Challenge Stradale.

In October 2015, Condon released a video of him picking up his first supercar, a 2006 Lamborghini Gallardo from Newport Beach, California, which led to a slow shift from carspotting content to personal vlogging. A few months later, he was laid off from his job, leading to him focusing on YouTube as his sole career. Over the following years, Condon found his groove in expanding and modifying his collection, which via YouTube, provided more capital for him to create progressively more interesting and surprising content.

Condon's content saw another shift with the COVID-19 pandemic in 2020, purchasing his first Hypercar, a Bugatti Veyron, along with building of his house in Bluffdale, Utah.

In 2023, Condon purchased a one of one Koenigsegg Agera HH, commissioned by David Heinemeier Hansson, and later owned by British racer Lewis Hamilton. Known affectionately as The Egg, it was featured heavily across his YouTube channels, however the crippling finance repayments led to it being sold in 2025, leading to a further diversification in content creation, such as finishing his iconic Batcave garage, and expanding his Lamborghini collection.

The Koenigsegg Agera HH, Formerly owned by Condon

In 2024, Condon bought a crashed Ferrari 812 Superfast, previously owned by actor Michael B. Jordan with plans to rebuild. Later in the year, it was revealed he had been audited by the Internal Revenue Service due to tax codes that heavily clash with Condon's line of business. He was fined around US$500,000.

=== Strad Pizza ===
In 2025, Condon opened a Restaurant, Strad Pizza in Scottsdale, Arizona, focusing on New York style Pizza, and is heavily styled after his car collection and signature purple colouring. Not long after opening, the store received high praise from Barstool Sports founder and pizza connoisseur Dave Portnoy, who gave it a 7 out of 7, a review that few other pizzerias have achieved, especially one so new to the business.

== Personal life ==
Since 2022, Condon has been in a relationship with Sophia Garcia de Leon, a Canadian Influencer.

He currently lives in a house he built in Bluffdale, Utah, just south of Salt Lake City, of which most of his content is filmed out of, and home to his car collection.

He also owns a house in Scottsdale, Arizona, nearby to his business, Strad Pizza.

== Car collection ==
=== Current ===
- 1969 GMC C15 Restomod
- 1987 Lamborghini LM002 in White
- 1993 Autozam AZ-1 in Solid White
- 2003 Lamborghini Murciélago 40th Anniversary Edition in Verde Artemis
- 2005 Bentley Continental in Silver Tempest on snow tracks
- 2006 Lamborghini Gallardo in Arancio Borealis
- 2012 Duke Dynamics widebody Lamborghini Aventador in exposed carbon fibre
- 2016 Liberty Walk widebody Pirelli Edition Lamborghini Adventador Roadster in Rosa Acantis
- 2020 Jeep Gladiator 6x6 Hellasasurus wrapped matte purple
- 2021 Ram 1500 TRX in Hydro Blue Pearl
- 2021 BMW G82 M4 wrapped Satin Silver
- 2022 Ferrari 812 Superfast (previously owned and crashed by Michael B. Jordan)
- 2023 Lamborghini Huracán Sterrato in Verde Scandal
- 2025 Lamborghini Urus SE in Viola Pasifae
- 2025 Lamborghini Revuelto in Viola Bast
- 2026 Lamborghini Temerario in Blue Glauco

=== Former ===
- 2002 Audi TT
- 2008 Audi R8 (2017-2019)
- 2019 Toyota GR Supra (2019-2020, sold to Jeffree Star)
- Ferrari 458 Spider (2020)
- 2008 Bugatti Veyron (2020-2023)
- 2021 Pandem Widebody Chevrolet Corvette Stingray (2021-2022)
- 2023 Chevrolet Corvette Z06 (2022-2023)
- 2013 Koenigsegg Agera HH (Made for David Heinemeier Hansson and owned by Lewis Hamilton) (2023-2025)
