= Andy Hunt (author) =

American computer programmer and author

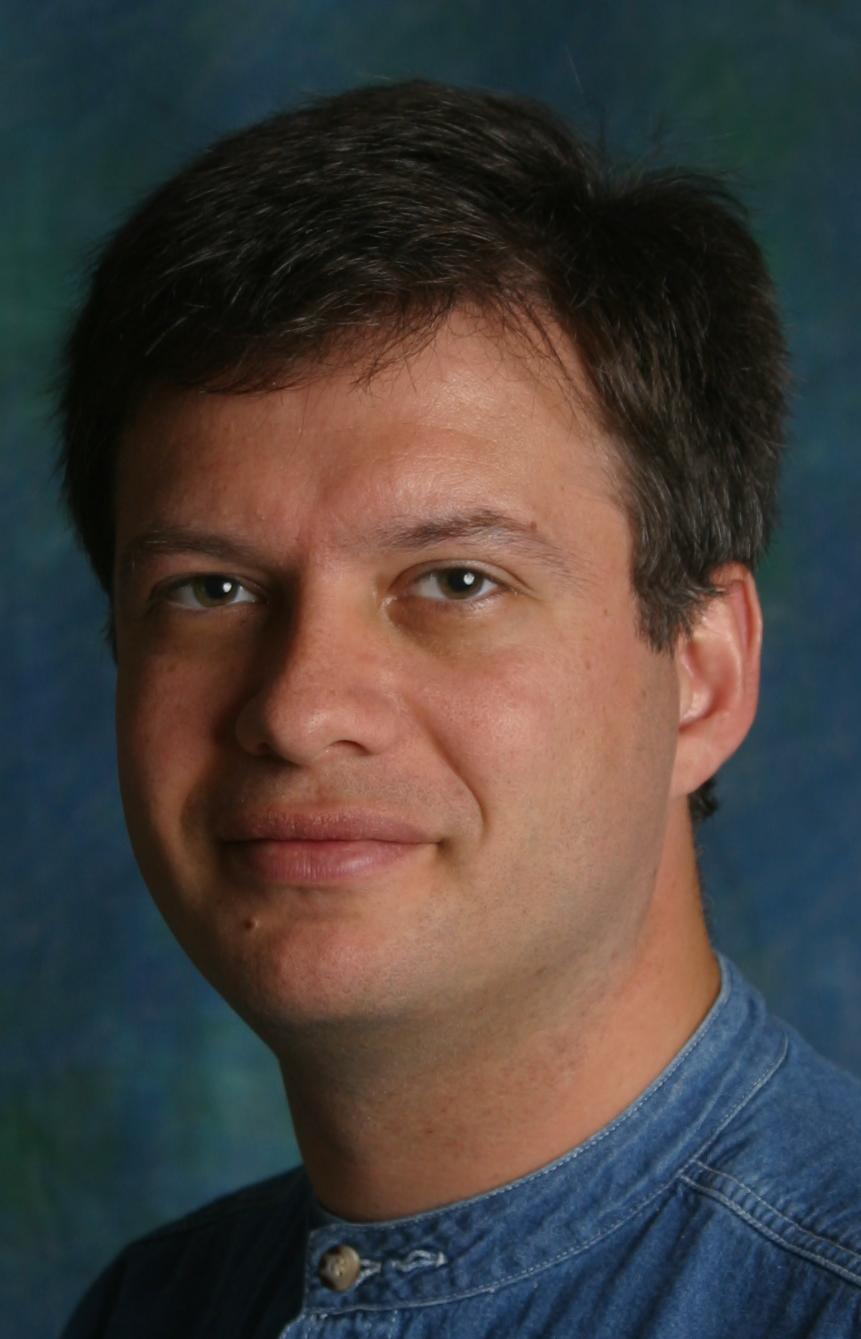
Andy Hunt.

Andy Hunt (sometimes credited as Andrew Hunt) is an author on software development. Hunt co-authored The Pragmatic Programmer, ten other books and many articles, and was one of the 17 original authors of the Agile Manifesto. He and partner Dave Thomas founded the Pragmatic Bookshelf series of books for software developers. He also plays the trumpet, flugel horn, and keyboards and produces music at Strange & Special Air Productions.

== Works ==
- Weatherly Hall, Andy Hunt, 2021, Cyclotron Press, ISBN 978-0999256039.
- The Pragmatic Programmer, 20th Anniversary Edition, David Thomas and Andrew Hunt, 2019, Addison Wesley, ISBN 978-0135957059.
- Conglommora Found, Andy Hunt, 2018, Cyclotron Press, ISBN 978-0999256022.
- Conglommora, Andy Hunt, 2017, Cyclotron Press, ISBN 978-0-9992560-1-5.
- The Pragmatic Programmer, Andrew Hunt and David Thomas, 1999, Addison Wesley, ISBN 0-201-61622-X.
- Programming Ruby: A Pragmatic Programmer's Guide, David Thomas and Andrew Hunt, 2000, Addison Wesley, ISBN 0-201-71089-7
- Pragmatic Version Control Using CVS, David Thomas and Andy Hunt, 2003, The Pragmatic Bookshelf, ISBN 0-9745140-0-4
- Pragmatic Unit Testing in Java with JUnit, Andy Hunt and David Thomas, 2003, The Pragmatic Bookshelf, ISBN 0-9745140-1-2
- Programming Ruby (2nd Edition), Dave Thomas, Chad Fowler, and Andrew Hunt, 2004, The Pragmatic Bookshelf, ISBN 0-9745140-5-5
- Pragmatic Unit Testing in C# with NUnit, Andy Hunt and David Thomas, 2004, The Pragmatic Bookshelf, ISBN 0-9745140-2-0
- Pragmatic Unit Testing in C# with NUnit, 2nd Edition, Andy Hunt and David Thomas with Matt Hargett, 2007, The Pragmatic Bookshelf, ISBN 978-0-9776166-7-1
- Practices of an Agile Developer, Venkat Subramaniam and Andy Hunt, 2006, The Pragmatic Bookshelf, ISBN 0-9745140-8-X
- Pragmatic Thinking and Learning: Refactor Your Wetware, Andy Hunt, 2008, The Pragmatic Bookshelf, ISBN 978-1-934356-05-0
- "Learn to Program using Minecraft Plugins with Bukkit", Andy Hunt, 2014, The Pragmatic Bookshelf, ISBN 978-1-93778-578-9
- "Learn to Program using Minecraft Plugins, 2nd Ed with CanaryMod", Andy Hunt, 2014, The Pragmatic Bookshelf, ISBN 978-1-94122-294-2
