= Dave Thomas (programmer) =

British computer programmer

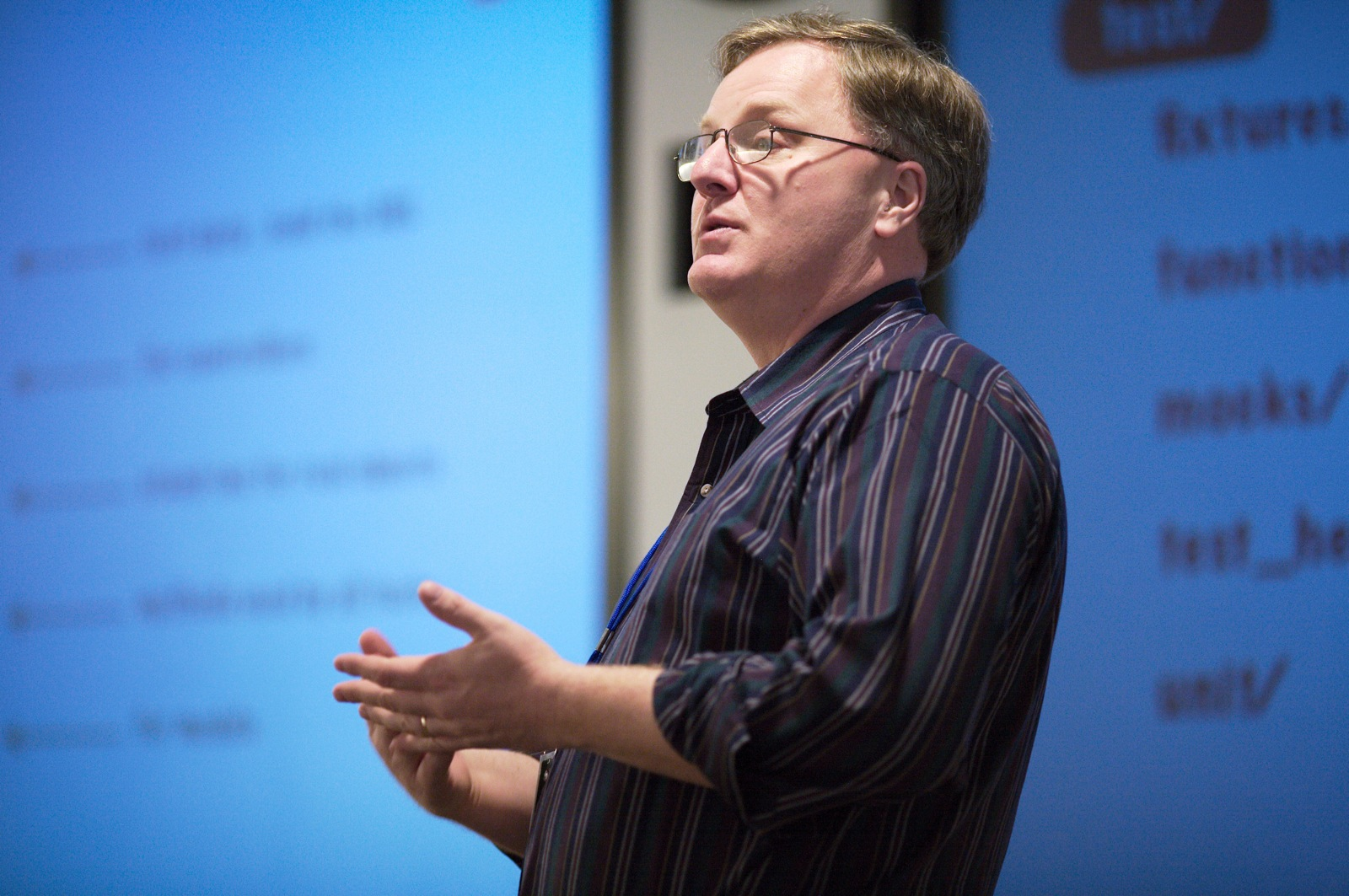
Dave Thomas speaking at the Pasadena Rails Studio

Dave Thomas (born 1960) is a computer programmer, author and editor. He has written about Ruby and together with Andy Hunt, he co-authored The Pragmatic Programmer and runs The Pragmatic Bookshelf publishing company. Thomas moved to the United States from England in 1994 and lives north of Dallas, Texas.

Thomas coined the phrases 'Code Kata' and 'DRY' (Don't Repeat Yourself), and was an original signatory and author of The Manifesto for Agile Software Development. He studied computer science at Imperial College London.

== Awards and honors ==
In 2006, Thomas became an ACM Distinguished Member.

== Works ==
- The Pragmatic Programmer, Andrew Hunt and David Thomas, 1999, Addison Wesley, ISBN 0-201-61622-X.
- Programming Ruby: A Pragmatic Programmer's Guide, David Thomas and Andrew Hunt, 2000, Addison Wesley, ISBN 0-201-71089-7
- Pragmatic Version Control Using CVS, David Thomas and Andrew Hunt, 2003, The Pragmatic Bookshelf, ISBN 0-9745140-0-4
- Pragmatic Unit Testing in Java with JUnit, Andrew Hunt and David Thomas, 2003, The Pragmatic Bookshelf, ISBN 0-9745140-1-2
- Pragmatic Unit Testing in C# with Nunit, Andrew Hunt and David Thomas, 2004, The Pragmatic Bookshelf, ISBN 0-9745140-2-0
- Programming Ruby (2nd Edition), Dave Thomas, Chad Fowler, and Andrew Hunt, 2004, The Pragmatic Bookshelf, ISBN 0-9745140-5-5
- Pragmatic Unit Testing in C# with Nunit, 2nd Edition, Andy Hunt and David Thomas with Matt Hargett, 2007, The Pragmatic Bookshelf, ISBN 978-0-9776166-7-1
- Agile Web Development with Rails, Dave Thomas, David Heinemeier Hansson, Andreas Schwarz, Thomas Fuchs, Leon Breedt, and Mike Clark, 2005, Pragmatic Bookshelf, ISBN 978-0976694007
- Agile Web Development with Rails (2nd edition), Dave Thomas, with David Heinemener Hansson, Mike Clark, Justin Gehtland, James Duncan Davidson, 2006, Pragmatic Bookshelf, ISBN 0-9776166-3-0
- Programming Elixir: Functional |> Concurrent |> Pragmatic |> Fun, Dave Thomas, foreword by José Valim the creator of Elixir, and edited by Lynn Beighley, 2014, Pragmatic Bookshelf, ISBN 978-1-937785-58-1
- simplicity: sustainable, humane, and effective software development, Dave Thomas, June 2025, Pragmatic Bookshelf, ISBN 979-8888651544
