= Pack200 =

Pack200, specified in JSR 200 (J2SE 1.5), deprecated in JEP 336 (Java SE 11) and removed in JEP 367 (Java SE 14), is a compacting archive format developed by Sun, capable of reducing JAR file sizes by up to a factor of 9, with a factor of 3 to 4 seen in practice. Pack200 is optimized for compressing JAR archive files, specifically the Java bytecode portion of the JAR files. Applications of this technology include faster Java application deployment over Java Web Start.

After Pack200, gzip compression is usually applied. In HTTP compression, such content is specified by the Content-Encoding type pack200-gzip. When stored as a file, the extension .pack.gz is used.

The archive begins with the four bytes 0xCA 0xFE 0xD0 0x0D (CAFED00D), a deliberate variant of the Java class file magic number.

Pack200 may also refer to the Pack200 compression tools (pack200 and unpack200) provided in the Java Development Kit from Java 5 until Java 14.

== Design ==
Pack200 modifies the contents of the Java class files in the JAR archive undergoing compression. Transformations to the class files include merging constant pools and removing duplicated attributes. The format is not lossless; it is possible for a JAR file after unpacking to not be identical to how it was before packing.
