= 37signals =

American web software company

37signals LLC
- Type: Private
- Founded: 1999; 27 years ago
- Founder: Jason Fried; Carlos Segura; Ernest Kim
- Headquarters: Chicago, Illinois, United States
- Key people: Jason Fried; David Heinemeier Hansson
- Products: Basecamp, Ruby on Rails, Highrise, HEY
- Services: Web applications
- Number of employees: 34 (2021)
- Website: 37signals.com

37signals (formerly Basecamp before reverting to its original name) is an American web software company based in Chicago, Illinois. The firm was co‑founded in 1999 by Jason Fried, Carlos Segura, and Ernest Kim as a web design company.

Since mid‑2004, the company's focus has shifted from web design to web application development. Its first commercial application was Basecamp, followed by Backpack, Campfire, and Highrise. The open source web application framework Ruby on Rails was initially created by David Heinemeier Hansson for internal use at 37signals, before being publicly released in 2004.

In February 2014, the company adopted a new strategy, focusing entirely on its flagship product, the software package also named Basecamp, and renaming the company from 37signals to Basecamp. Jason Fried and David Heinemeier Hansson have published several books under the 37signals name, and in May 2022, citing their present-day focus on both Basecamp and HEY, reverted to 37signals as their company name.

== History ==
Logo used until 2019

The company 37signals was originally named after the 37 extraterrestrial radio signals identified by astronomer Paul Horowitz as potential messages from extraterrestrial intelligence. Work on the company's first product, the project management application Basecamp, began in 2003.

By 2005, the company had moved away from consulting work to focus exclusively on its own web applications. The Ruby on Rails web application framework was extracted from the work on Basecamp and released as open source. In 2006, the company announced that Jeff Bezos had acquired a minority stake via his personal investment company, Bezos Expeditions. The same year, Jason Fried, 37signals CEO, was included among MIT Technology Review's TR35 honoring technologists and scientists under the age of 35 for their ground-breaking inventions and research.

In 2014, 37signals changed its name to Basecamp and chose to focus solely on that product. As of August 2018, the Highrise product also stopped accepting new signups.

In September 2019, Basecamp gained some notoriety for purchasing Google Ads in the name of their own company because other organizations bought the keyword "Basecamp", causing four competitors to appear above Basecamp's own website in search results. Jason Fried called Google's search result policy a "shakedown". A Google spokesperson responded that competitors are not allowed to use trademarked names in their keywords if the owner of the trademark files a complaint with Google. Since the story broke, Google has stopped competitors from using the Basecamp trademark.

After Apple threatened to pull the service's iOS app, Hey, from the App Store, in September 2020, Basecamp signed up to help launch the Coalition for App Fairness to fight Apple's app store policies and "create a level playing field" for businesses.

In 2021, employees raised concerns about an internal collection of "funny" customer names, including names of ostensibly American, European, African, and Asian origin. Basecamp responded by announcing several policy changes, such as forbidding "societal and political discussions" in internal forums, which Fried described as a "major distraction." The company offered severance packages to employees who disagreed with the changes. Ultimately, one-third of the company resigned.

37signals has started cloud repatriation of its services, which involves moving its resources away from cloud computing. Chief technology officer David Heinemeier Hansson said in September 2023 that the project had saved the company $1 million.

In 2024, 37signals launched ONCE, a product line centered around software that customers purchase once and run themselves instead of paying a recurring subscription. The first ONCE product launch was Campfire, the company's team chat application. Campfire was offered as a self-hosted application, allowing customers to install it on their own servers and retain control of their data.

In 2025. 37signals introduced Fizzy, a new project management application based around kanban-style workflow.

== Products ==
=== Basecamp ===
Basecamp is 37signals' first product, a web-based project management tool launched in 2004. Its primary features are to-do lists, milestone management, forum-like messaging, file sharing, and time tracking.

Basecamp Next was released in 2012, and Basecamp 3 was released in 2014. Basecamp 3 supports replies by email, but does not support bottom-posting.

=== Campfire ===
Campfire, a business-oriented online chat service, launched in 2006. It was later merged into Basecamp 3, and was discontinued as a standalone service in 2013.

In 2024 37signals re-launched Campfire as part of their ONCE line of products, allowing customers to buy the software outright to self-host on their own servers.

Since 21 August 2025 Campfire is opensource software under a MIT license

=== Highrise ===
Highrise is a customer relationship management (CRM) product developed by 37signals and launched in 2007. Highrise was spun off as its own company in 2014 and operated as an independent business headed by Nathan Kontny, with 37signals retaining ownership. In 2018 37signals (under the new Basecamp brand) brought Highrise back in-house, and closed it for new sign ups later that year. The product remains in use by a number of companies.

=== Ruby on Rails ===
Ruby on Rails is a free web application framework created by David Heinemeier Hansson, now a partner at 37signals. It was originally used to make 37signals' first product, Basecamp, and was then extracted and released as open source in 2004.

=== Hey ===
Hey (stylized in all-caps as HEY) is a premium email service started in June 2020 by Basecamp. A few days after its release, Apple threatened to pull the service's iOS app from the App Store unless Basecamp created an in-app subscription option and shared a cut of the revenue with Apple.

=== Fizzy ===
Fizzy is a kanban-style project management application launched in 2025. The product is designed around visual boards for managing tasks and workflows.

== Works ==
Jason Fried and David Heinemeier Hansson published several books under the 37signals name.

- Defensive Design for the Web: How to improve error messages, help, forms, and other crisis points, New Riders Press, 2004 ISBN 0-7357-1410-X
- Getting Real: The Smarter, Faster, Easier Way to Build a Successful Web Application, 37signals, 2006, ISBN 0-578-0128-12
- Rework (2010, RandomHouse) became a New York Times best seller.
- Remote: Office Not Required (2013, RandomHouse), which is about allowing employees to work from remote offices, was also a New York Times best seller. The book was about 37signals' experience with a largely remote workforce.
- It Doesn't Have to Be Crazy at Work, October 2, 2018, ISBN 978-0062874788
