= You aren't gonna need it =

Software engineering principle

"You aren't gonna need it" (YAGNI) is a principle which arose from extreme programming (XP) that states a programmer should not add functionality until deemed necessary. Other forms of the phrase include "You aren't going to need it" and "You ain't gonna need it".

Ron Jeffries, a co-founder of XP, explained the philosophy: "Always implement things when you actually need them, never when you just foresee that you [will] need them."

== Context ==
YAGNI is a principle behind the XP practice of "do the simplest thing that could possibly work" (DTSTTCPW). It is meant to be used in combination with several other practices, such as continuous refactoring, continuous automated unit testing, and continuous integration. Used without continuous refactoring, it could lead to disorganized code and massive rework, known as technical debt. YAGNI's dependency on supporting practices is part of the original definition of XP.

== See also ==
- Don't repeat yourself (DRY)
- Feature creep
- If it ain't broke, don't fix it
- KISS principle – "Keep it simple, stupid"
- Minimum viable product
- MoSCoW method – development prioritization technique
- Muntzing – electronics minimalism
- Overengineering
- Single-responsibility principle (SRP)
- SOLID – Object-oriented programming design principles
- Unix philosophy – simple tools
- Lazy evaluation
- Lazy loading
