= Index of object-oriented programming articles =

This is a list of terms found in object-oriented programming.

== A ==
- Abstract class
- Accessibility
- Abstract method
- Abstraction (computer science)
- Access control
- Access modifiers
- Accessor method
- Adapter pattern
- Aspect-oriented

== B ==
- Base class
- Boxing
- Bridge pattern
- Builder pattern

== C ==
- Cast
- Chain-of-responsibility pattern
- Class
- Class hierarchy
- Class method
- Class object
- Class variable
- Cohesion
- Collection class
- Composition
- Constructor
- Container
- Contravariance
- Copy constructor
- Coupling
- Covariance

== D ==
- Data-driven design
- Data hiding
- Default constructor
- Deep copy
- Delegation
- Dependency injection
- Destructor
- Dispatch table
- Dynamic binding
- Dynamic dispatch
- Dynamically typed language

== E ==
- Early binding
- Eigenclass
- Encapsulation (computer programming)
- Exception handling
- Extension

== F ==
- Facade - pattern
- Factory method pattern
- Factory object
- Factory pattern
- Field
- Finalizer
- First-class function
- Fragile base class
- Function composition

== G ==
- Generic programming
- God object

== H ==
- Heap-based memory allocation
- Helper class
- Hybrid language

== I ==
- Immutable object (also called immutable value)
- Information hiding
- Inheritance
- Initialize
- Inline function
- Inner class
- Instance (computer science)
- Instance method
- Instance variable (also called data member)
- Interaction diagram
- Interface
- Inversion of control (IoC)
- Iterator

== L ==
- Late binding
- Liskov substitution principle

== M ==
- Member accessibility
- Members, any contents of a class: Attributes, Methods, and Inner classes
- Message passing
- Metaclass
- Metaprogramming
- Method (computer programming)
- Mixin
- Mock object
- Mock trainwreck
- Model–view–controller (MVC)
- Modular programming
- Multiple dispatch
- Multiple inheritance
- Multitier architecture
- Mutable variable
- Mutator method

== N ==
- Name mangling
- Namespace
- Native method
- Nested class

== O ==
- Object (computer science)
- Object type (see Boxing)
- OOPSLA – annual conference on Object-Oriented Programming, Systems, Languages, and Applications
- Open/closed principle
- Orthogonality
- Overload

== P ==
- Package
- Parametric overloading
- Parameterized classes
- Parnas's principles
- Partial class
- Patterns
- Policy-based design
- Polymorphic
- Primitive data type
- private, a way of encapsulation in object-oriented programming
- Programming paradigm
- protected, a way of encapsulation in object-oriented programming
- Protocol
- Prototype pattern
- Prototype-based programming
- public, a way of encapsulation in object-oriented programming
- Pure polymorphism
- Pure virtual function (also called pure virtual method)

== R ==
- Rapid application development (sometimes Rapid prototyping)
- Recursion
- Refinement
- Reflective programming (reflection)
- Responsibility-driven design
- Reverse polymorphism
- Run-time type information

== S ==
- Scope
- Shallow copy, in contrast to deep copy
- Single responsibility principle
- Singleton pattern
- Singly rooted hierarchy
- Slicing
- Specification class, a class implementing abstract class
- Stack-based memory allocation
- Static method
- Static typing, in contrast to dynamic typing
- Strong and weak typing
- Subclass (also called child class or derived class)
- Subclass coupling
- SOLID
- Substitutability, principle of
- Subtype
- Superclass (also called parent class or base class)

== T ==
- Template method pattern
- Test-driven development
- Tiers
- Trait
- Type
- Type conversion (also called typecasting)
- Type variance

== V ==
- Virtual class
- Virtual function (also called virtual method)
- Virtual function pointer (also called virtual method pointer)
- Virtual inheritance (Object Oriented Programming)
- Virtual method table (also called vtable, virtual function table or virtual method table)
- Void type

== W ==
- Weak reference

== Y ==
- Yo-yo problem
