= Opaque pointer =

Opaque data type which stores a memory address

In computer programming, an opaque pointer is a special case of an opaque data type, a data type declared to be a pointer to a record or data structure of some unspecified type.

Opaque pointers are present in several programming languages including Ada, C, C++, D and Modula-2.

== Use ==
If the language the pointer is implemented with is strongly typed, programs and procedures that have no other information about an opaque pointer type T can still declare variables, arrays, and record fields of type T, assign values of that type, and compare those values for equality. However, they will not be able to de-reference such a pointer, and can only change the object's content by calling some procedure that has the missing information.

Opaque pointers are a way to hide the implementation details of an interface from ordinary clients, so that the implementation may be changed without the need to recompile the modules using it. This benefits the programmer as well since a simple interface can be created, and most details can be hidden in another file. This is important for providing binary code compatibility through different versions of a shared library, for example.

This technique is described in Design Patterns as the Bridge pattern. It is sometimes referred to as "handle classes", the "Pimpl idiom" (for "pointer to implementation idiom"), "Compiler firewall idiom", "d-pointer" or "Cheshire Cat", especially among the C++ community. It is heavily used in the Qt and KDE libraries.

== Examples ==
=== Ada ===
package Library_Interface is

   type Handle is limited private;

   -- Operations...

private
   type Hidden_Implementation;    -- Defined in the package body
   type Handle is access Hidden_Implementation;
end Library_Interface;

The type Handle is an opaque pointer to the real implementation, that is not defined in the specification. Note that the type is not only private (to forbid the clients from accessing the type directly, and only through the operations), but also limited (to avoid the copy of the data structure, and thus preventing dangling references).

package body Library_Interface is

   type Hidden_Implementation is record
      ...    -- The actual implementation can be anything
   end record;

   -- Definition of the operations...

end Library_Interface;

These types are sometimes called "Taft types" – named after Tucker Taft, the main designer of Ada 95 – because they were introduced in the so-called 'Taft Amendment' to Ada 83.

=== C ===
In Integer.h:

#pragma once

typedef struct Integer Integer;

/*
 * The compiler considers struct Integer an incomplete type. Incomplete types
 * can be used in declarations.
 */

size_t integerSize();

void integerSetValue(Integer* i, int val);

int integerGetValue(Integer* i);

In Integer.c:

#include "Integer.h"

typedef struct Integer {
    int value;
} Integer;

/*
 * The caller will handle allocation.
 * Provide the required information only
 */

size_t integerSize() {
    return sizeof(Integer);
}

void integerSetValue(Integer* i, int val) {
    i->value = val;
}

int integerGetValue(Integer* i) {
    return i->value;
}

This example demonstrates a way to achieve the information hiding (encapsulation) aspect of object-oriented programming using the C language. If someone wanted to change the definition of struct Integer, it would be unnecessary to recompile any other modules in the program that use the Integer.h header file unless the API was also changed. Note that it may be desirable for the functions to check that the passed pointer is not NULL, but such checks have been omitted above for brevity.

=== C++ ===
In C++, the usage of modules can be used to provide the same compilation speed benefits as the PIMPL idiom, however the PIMPL idiom remains useful for ABI size guarantees and providing encapsulation.

In Foo.cppm:

export module wikipedia.examples:Foo;

import std;

using std::unique_ptr;

export namespace wikipedia::examples {

class Foo {
private:
    struct IntPair; // Not defined here
    unique_ptr<IntPair> ptr; // Opaque pointer
public:
    Foo(); // Constructor
    Foo(const Foo& other); // Copy constructor
    Foo(Foo&& other); // Move constructor
    Foo& operator=(const Foo& other); // Copy assignment operator
    Foo& operator=(Foo&& other); // Move assignment operator
    ~Foo(); // Destructor

    // Other operations...
};

}

In Foo.cpp:

module wikipedia.examples:Foo;

namespace wikipedia::examples {

struct Foo::IntPair {
    int a;
    int b;
};

Foo::Foo(): 
    ptr{std::make_unique<IntPair>()} {}

Foo::Foo(const Foo& other): 
    ptr{std::make_unique<IntPair>(*other.ptr)} {}

Foo::Foo(Foo&& other) = default;

Foo& Foo::operator=(const Foo& other) {
    *ptr = *other.ptr;
    return *this;
}

Foo& Foo::operator=(Foo&& other) = default;

Foo::~Foo() = default;

}

== See also ==
- Application binary interface
- Handle (computing)
- Programming idiom
