= Children and Sex =

1981 book

- Title page for Children and Sex: New Findings, New Perspectives (1981)
- Editor: Larry Constantine
- Language: English
- Publisher: Little, Brown
- Publication date: 1981
- Pages: 288
- ISBN: 9780316153317

Children and Sex: New Findings, New Perspectives is a psychology book edited by Larry L. Constantine, originally published by Little, Brown.

== Content ==
The book contains 20 original and republished scientific essays by authors including Throre Langfeldt, Michael Ingram, Frits Bernard, Mavis Tsai, David Finkelhor and Bennett M. Berger.

The book starts with a global, multicultural overview of child sexuality. Chapter three discusses sexual latency. In its fourth chapter, the book explores the topic of incest. The following chapter includes Constantine's research and review regarding the effects of childhood sexual experiences, as well as the factors that affect such effects.

Among the views presented by the authors on the book are those that there is no such thing as a latency stage between early childhood and adolescence and that boys that undergo sexual offenses can sometimes be "participating victims" in search of affection.

== Reception ==
A review by pediatrician Glen P. Aylward published on the The Journal of Pediatrics stated that the book is "very useful for pediatricians" and that "this volume provides a better understanding of childhood sexuality and fosters increased thinking and awareness of this controversial subject."

Writing for the The New England Journal of Medicine, Barbara Gastel stated that "many open-minded, reflective readers are likely to find the work thought-provoking and expanding."
