= Algoid =

Algoid may refer to:

- things relating to algae
- Algoid (Dungeons & Dragons), a fictional monster in the Dungeons & Dragons role-playing game
- Algoid (programming language), 2012 educational programming language
