= Package principles =

Way of organizing classes in larger systems

In computer programming, package principles are a way of organizing classes in larger systems to make them more organized and manageable. They aid in understanding which classes should go into which packages (package cohesion) and how these packages should relate with one another (package coupling). Package principles also includes software package metrics, which help to quantify the dependency structure, giving different and/or more precise insights into the overall structure of classes and packages.

== See also ==
- SOLID
- Robert Cecil Martin
