= Efferent =

Efferent may refer to:

== Anatomical structures ==
Meaning 'conveying away from a center':

- Efferent arterioles, conveying blood away from the Bowman's capsule in the kidney
- Efferent nerve fiber, carries nerve impulses away from the central nervous system toward the peripheral effector organs
- Efferent lymph vessel, lymph vessels that carry lymph from a lymph node
- Efferent ducts, connect the rete testis with the initial section of the epididymis

== Other uses ==
- Efferent coupling, a metric in software development

== See also ==
- Afferent (disambiguation)
