= Mock trainwreck =

In computer science, the term Mock Trainwreck refers to the difficulty of mocking a deeply nested model structure. Mocking is the creation of mock objects which can be used to mimic the behavior of real objects, often because it is hard to test with the real objects. A trainwreck is multiple levels of method calls (called a chain), which each return objects upon which new methods can be called. Deeply nested models go against the Law of Demeter because the property's property must be accessed. The Law of Demeter, also known as the principle of least knowledge, is a design guideline to promote loose coupling of data structures that are not closely related, and thus should probably not be coupled together. In addition, this level of coupling can be considered an inappropriate intimacy code smell.

Mock trainwrecks should be avoided when possible. This is because not only does it makes it harder to test the code which uses them, but also because they are harder to work with from a design standpoint. In addition, it increases the amount of information an object can access, due to its close relation with other parameters that are not related to its main functionality.

== Example of a trainwreck ==
If someone wanted to write a test looking for a library that receives public funding, or by its head librarian, he or she might use code like the following:

Java

assertEqual(
    l.getHeadLibrarian()
        .getName().split(" ")[1]
    , "Smith")
assertEqual( 
    l.getFunding().getType()
    , "public")

Ruby

l.headLibrarian.name.split(/ +/).last.should == "Smith"
l.funding.type.should == "public"

To mock up an object that matches the search result, they would have to have mocking code like what follows:

Java

HeadLibrarian h = mock(HeadLibrarian.class);
when(h.getName()).thenReturn("Jane Smith");

Funding f = mock(Funding.class);
when(f.getType()).thenReturn("public");

Library l = mock(Library.class);
when(l.getHeadLibrarian()).thenReturn(h);
when(l.getFunding()).thenReturn(f);

Ruby

h = mock('HeadLibrarian', :name => 'Jane Smith')
f = mock('Funding', :type => 'public')
l = mock('Library', :HeadLibrarian => h, :Funding => f)

This is an example of a mock trainwreck, because it is a mock up of two unrelated objects, but it relies on a class, Library, to point to them both.

== Ways to avoid the trainwreck ==
A mock trainwreck can be avoided by making general code changes or by more specific changes through the use of dependency injection and libraries. General code changes allow a nested model to be made more simple, primarily though the creation of an assessor to access the sub property. This prevents the deep nesting which causes the mock trainwreck, and this assessor can be mocked easily.

=== Dependency injection ===
Dependency injection (DI), the process by which a dependency is passed to the client which will use it, can be used to soften the trainwreck. One method of DI that is easy to use is a location object to reduce the complexity of building the mock object. Below is the example above reworked with a DI build_mock method to help set mock values on dependent objects. While for this simple example it doesn't appear to help much, in a more complicated scenario it could reduce complexity in manually setting the values.

def build_mock(name, map, locator, refs)
  obj =  mock(name, map)
  refs.each do |ref|
    obj.send("#{ref}=", locator[ref.to_sym])
  end
  obj
end

locator = {}
locator[:HeadLibrarian] = mock('HeadLibrarian', :name => 'Jane Smith')
locator[:Funding] = mock('Funding', :type => 'public')
locator[:Library] = build_mock('Library', {}, locator, ['HeadLibrarian', 'Funding'])

=== Libraries ===
==== Mockito ====
Testing library in various languages can make the mock trainwreck easier to navigate with helpers. An example is Mockito that provides annotations to assist in injecting mocks into objects. Using the @InjectMocks annotation and @Mock annotation, when Mockito initializes all the mocks it will inject Library with the mocks for funding and head librarian.

public class LibraryTester {
    @Mock HeadLibrarian h;
    @Mock Funding f;
    @InjectMocks Library l;
    
    @Before public void initMocks() {
        MockitoAnnotations.initMocks(this);        
    }
    
    @Test public void testLibrary() {
        when(l.getHeadLibrarian().getName()).thenReturn("Jane Smith");
        when(l.getFunding().getType()).thenReturn("public");
        
        //tests here
    }
}

==== Demeter ====
The use of libraries can also be used to address mock trainwreck. One such library is called demeter, and it can be used to provide Law of Demeter duck typing assessors that automatically creates assessors for single level nested models. By using this library, a person can mock the assessors that their code uses of the child function, as seen in the example below.

require "demeter"

class Library
  extend Demeter

  demeter :HeadLibrarian
  demeter :Funding

  def initialize
    @HeadLibrarian = HeadLibrarian.new
    @Funding = Funding.new
  end
end

l = mock('Library', :HeadLibrarian_name => 'Jane Smith', :Funding.type => 'public')
l.HeadLibrarian_name #Jane Smith
