= Afferent =

Afferent may refer to:

== Anatomical structures ==
Meaning "conveying towards a center":

- Afferent arterioles, blood vessels that supply the nephrons
- Afferent lymphatic vessels, lymph vessels that carry lymph to a lymph node
- Afferent nerve fiber, an axonal projection that arrives at a particular region

== Other uses ==
- Afferent couplings, in software, classes in other packages that depend upon classes within a given package

== See also ==
- Efferent (disambiguation)
