= Usage-centered design =

Approach to user interface design with focus on user intentions and usage patterns

Usage-centered design is an approach to user interface design based on a focus on user intentions and usage patterns. It analyzes users in terms of the roles they play in relation to systems and employs abstract (essential) use cases for task analysis. It derives visual and interaction design from abstract prototypes based on the understanding of user roles and task cases.

Usage-centered design was introduced by Larry Constantine and Lucy Lockwood. The primary reference is their book.

== Usage-centered design methods ==
Usage-centered design is largely based on formal, abstract models such as models of interaction between user roles, UML workflow models and task case and role profiles. Usage-centered design proponents argue for abstract modelling while many designers use realistic personas, scenarios and high-fidelity prototypes. The techniques have been applied with particular success in complex software projects, some of which have been reported in case studies.

== Usage-centered design and activity-centered design approach ==
Usage-centered design share some common ideas with activity-centered design. It is concerned more with the activities of users but not the users per se. Constantine (2006) presents an integrated framework where the models of Usage-centered design are enriched with concepts from the activity theory.

== See also ==
- Ergonomics
- Understanding by Design
