= Larry Constantine =

Software engineer, novelist, therapist

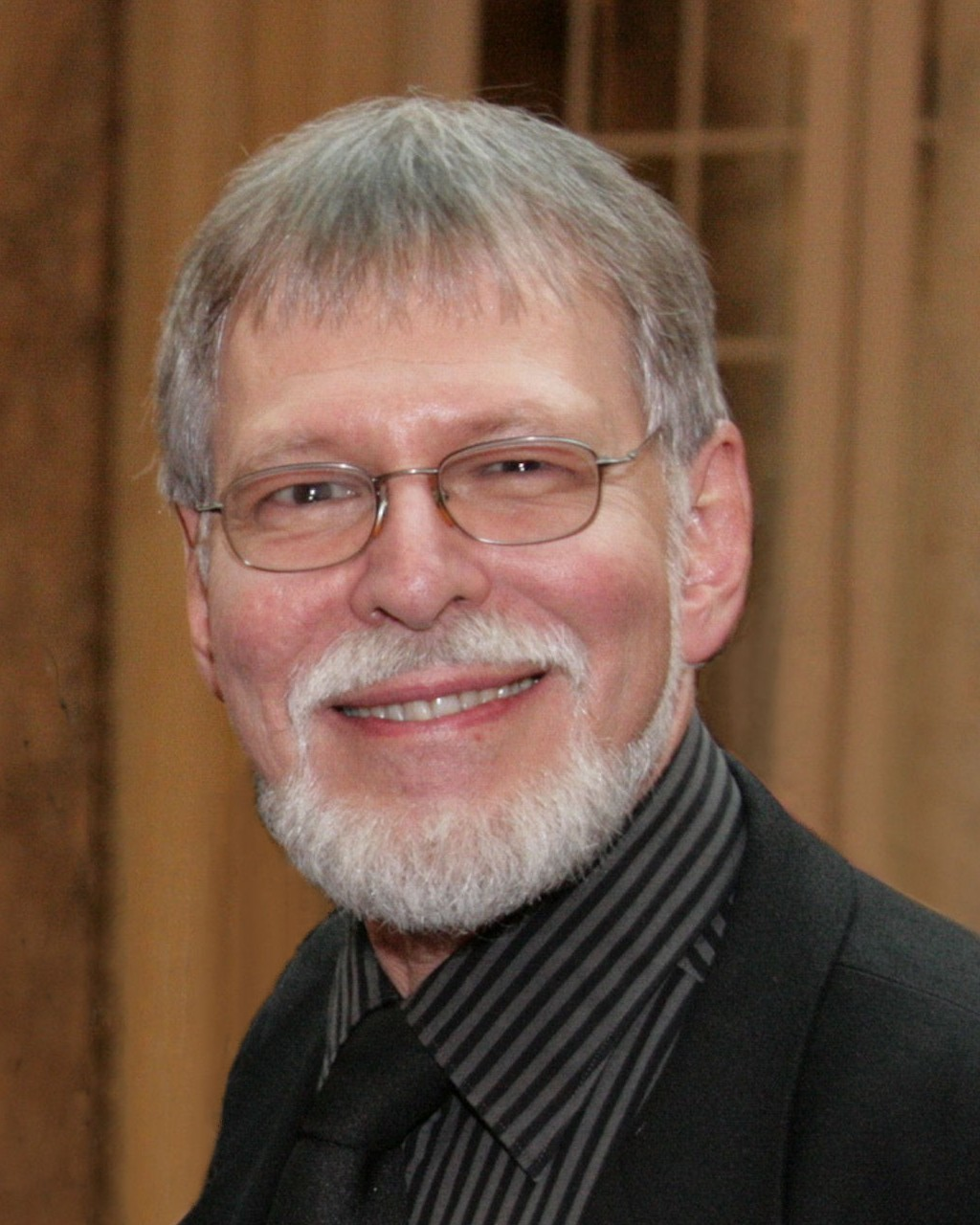
- Born: February 14, 1943 (age 83); Anoka, Minnesota
- Education: MIT Sloan School of Management (S.B., 1967)
- Known for: Structured design, structured systems analysis and design method
- Awards: Jolt Award, Stevens Award, Simon Rockower Award, ACM Fellow
- Scientific career
- Fields: Computer science
- Workplaces: University of Madeira

Notes
- Writes fiction under pen name, Lior Samson

Larry LeRoy Constantine (born 1943) is an American software engineer, and was a professor in the Center for Exact Sciences and Engineering at the University of Madeira in Portugal. He is considered one of the pioneers of computing. He has contributed numerous concepts and techniques forming the foundations of modern practice in software engineering and applications design and development.

== Biography ==
Constantine grew up in Anoka, Minnesota, and graduated from Anoka High School in 1961 after being active in debate and thespians as well as other extra curricular activities. He was named "Most Likely to Succeed" by his classmates. Constantine received an S.B. in management from the MIT Sloan School of Management in 1967 with a specialization in information systems and psychology. He received a certificate in family therapy 1973 from the Boston Family Institute, two-year post graduate training program.

Constantine started his working career as a technical aid/programmer at M.I.T. Laboratory for Nuclear Science in 1963. From 1963 to 1966 he was a staff consultant and programmer/analyst at C E I R, Inc. From 1966 to 1968 he was president of the Information & Systems Institute, Inc. In 1967 also he became a postgraduate program instructor at the Wharton School of Business, University of Pennsylvania. From 1968 to 1972 he was a faculty member of the I.B.M. Systems Research Institute.

In 1973 he became director of research, Concord, Massachusetts Family Service Society. From 1973 to 1980 he was assistant clinical professor of psychiatry, Tufts University, School of Medicine. Until 1987 he was assistant professor of human development and family studies (adjunct), University of Connecticut. From 1984 to 1986 he was also clinical supervisor, adolescent and family intervention, LUK, Inc., Fitchburg, Massachusetts. From 1987 to 1993 he also worked as independent consultant. He remained a chief scientist, principal consultant, Constantine & Lockwood, Ltd since 1993. From 1994-1999 he was professor of information technology, University of Technology Sydney, Australia. Since 2006 has been a professor in the mathematics and engineering department at the University of Madeira in Portugal, where he headed the Laboratory for Usage-centered Software Engineering (LabUSE), A former research center dedicated to study the human aspects of modern software engineering before becoming Institute Fellow at the Madeira Interactive Technologies Institute in 2010.

In 1999 Constantine received the Jolt Award for Product Excellence, best book of 1999 for his "Software for Use". In 2001 he received the Platinum Award of Excellence (first place), Performance-Centered Design Competition 2001: Siemens AG, STEP-7 Lite. In 2006 he was recognized as a Distinguished Engineer by the Association for Computing Machinery, and in 2007 he was made an ACM Fellow. He is the 2009 recipient of the Stevens Award for "outstanding contributions to the literature or practice of methods for software and systems development." He received a Simon Rockower Award in 2011 from the American Jewish Press Association.

== Work ==
Constantine specializes in the human side of software development. His published work includes the influential classic text, Structured Design, written with Ed Yourdon, and the award-winning "Software for Use", written with Lucy Lockwood. His contributions to the practice of software development began in 1968 with his pioneering work in "Modular programming" concepts.

Constantine was the primary force behind the discipline of Structured Design, in his book of the same name. The key features of Structured Design, such as Structure Chart, the Data-flow diagram are all commonly used and taught worldwide.

=== Structured design ===
Constantine, who learned programming at the Massachusetts Institute of Technology, began his professional career in computers with a summer job at Scientific Computing, at the time a subsidiary of Control Data Corporation, in Minneapolis. He went on to full-time work at MIT’s Laboratory for Nuclear Science, where he wrote routines for analyzing spark chamber photographs, and then to C-E-I-R, Inc., where he worked on economics simulations, business applications, project management tools, and programming languages.

While still an undergraduate at MIT he began work on what was to become structured design, formed his first consulting company, and taught in a postgraduate program at the University of Pennsylvania Wharton School. The core of structured design, including structure charts and coupling and cohesion metrics, was substantially complete by 1968, when it was presented at the National Symposium on Modular Programming. He joined the faculty of IBM’s Systems Research Institute the same year, where he taught for four years and further refined his concepts.

As part of structured design, Constantine developed the concepts of cohesion (the degree to which the internal contents of a module are related) and coupling (the degree to which a module depends upon other modules). These two concepts have been influential in the development of software engineering, and stand alone from structured design as significant contributions in their own right. They have proved foundational in areas ranging from software design to software metrics, and indeed have passed into the vernacular of the discipline.

Constantine also developed methodologies that combine human-computer-interaction design with software engineering. One methodology, usage-centered design, is the topic of his 1999 book with Lucy Lockwood, "Software For Use". This is a third significant contribution to the field, being both well used in professional practice and the subject of academic study, and taught in a number of human-computer interface courses and universities around the world. His work on human-computer interaction was influential for techniques like essential use cases and usage-centered design, which are widely used for building interactive software systems.

=== Family therapy ===
Constantine trained under family therapy pioneers David Kantor and Fred and Bunny Duhl at the Boston Family Institute, completing a two-year postgraduate certificate program in 1973. From 1973 to 1980 he was an assistant clinical professor of psychiatry in the Tufts University School of Medicine training family therapists and supervising trainees at Boston State Hospital. He became a Licensed Clinical Social Worker and later a Licensed Marriage and Family Therapist in Massachusetts and was designated an approved supervisor by the American Association for Marriage and Family Therapy.

His contributions to theory and research in family therapy and human systems theory were summarized in Family Paradigms (Guilford Press, 1986), a book heralded at the time as “one of the finest theoretical books yet published in the family therapy field” and “among the most significant developments of the decade.” This work has also seen application in organization development.

He and his wife at the time, Joan Constantine, also researched and practiced group marriage in the 1970s. They created the Family Tree organization to promote healthy non-monogamous families. They collaboratively authored a book on the subject in 1974, Group Marriage: A Study of Contemporary Multilateral Marriage (Collier Books, 1974).

=== Patents ===
US Patents: 7010753 Anticipating drop acceptance indication; 7055105 Drop-enabled tabbed dialog; 8161026 Inexact date entry

== Music ==
Although he played piano, saxophone, and violin as a child, Constantine gave up instrumental performance for singing. He sang with the award-winning Burtones ensemble while a student at MIT, is a twelve-year veteran and alum of the semi-professional Zamir Chorale of Boston, and is a member of the Zachor Choral Ensemble, a Boston-based group dedicated to keeping alive the memory of the Holocaust through music.

Constantine is also a composer with several major works to his credit. He studied theory and composition under George Litterst and Stephan Peisch at the New England Conservatory. His first commissioned work, Concerto Grosso No. 1 in G-minor, “Serendipity,” was premiered by the Rockford (Illinois) Pops Orchestra on 9 July 1981. His choral work, “No Hidden Meanings,” based on a text by psychologist Sheldon Kopp, was commissioned by the American Humanist Association and premiered at MIT’s Kresge Auditorium, 20 June 1982.

His choral setting of the traditional Shehechiyanu blessing was premiered April 18, 2010 by HaShirim at the groundbreaking for Temple Ahavat Achim in Gloucester, Massachusetts.

== Fiction ==
Constantine, an active (professional) member of the Science Fiction and Fantasy Writers of America, is the author of numerous short stories, mostly published under several pseudonyms. He edited Infinite Loop (Miller Freeman Books, 1993), an anthology of science fiction by writers in the computer field described in the Midwest Book Review as "quite simply one of the best anthologies to appear in recent years.”

Writing under the pen name Lior Samson, Constantine is the author of several critically acclaimed political thrillers, including Bashert, The Dome, Web Games, The Rosen Singularity, Chipset, Gasline, and Flight Track. His other fiction includes Avalanche Warning (Gesher Press, 2013), The Four-Color Puzzle (Gesher Press, 2013), and Requisite Variety: Collected Short Fiction (Gesher Press, 2011). His first novel, Bashert, was included in a time capsule at MIT by the class of 1967 for its 50th reunion. The time capsule is slated to be opened in 2067.

== Publications ==
Constantine has more than 200 published papers to his credit, as well as 22 books. A selection:

- 1974. Group marriage: A study of contemporary multilateral marriage. With Joan Constantine. Collier Books, 1974.
- 1975. Structured Design. With Ed Yourdon. Yourdon Press.
- 1981. Children and Sex: New Findings, New Perspectives. (ed.) with Floyd Martinson. Little Brown & Co (T).
- 1986. Family Paradigms: The Practice of Theory in Family Therapy. Guilford Press.
- 1995. Constantine on Peopleware. Yourdon Press Computing Series.
- 1999. Software for Use: A Practical Guide to the Essential Models and Methods of Usage-Centered Design. With Lucy Lockwood. Reading, MA: Addison-Wesley.
- 2001. The Peopleware Papers: Notes on the Human Side of Software. NJ: Prentice Hall.
- 2001. Beyond Chaos: The Expert Edge in Managing Software Development. (ed.). Boston: Addison-Wesley.
- 2002. ''The Unified Process Transition and Production Phases. (ed.) with Scott W. Ambler. CMP Books, Lawrence 2002, ISBN 1-57820-092-X.

== See also ==
- Rebecca Wirfs-Brock
