= Rebecca Wirfs-Brock =

American software engineer and consultant

Rebecca J. Wirfs-Brock
- Born: 1953 (age 72–73); Portland, Oregon
- Education: University of Oregon
- Known for: Responsibility-driven design
- Partner: Allen Wirfs-Brock
- Website: www.wirfs-brock.com

Rebecca J. Wirfs-Brock (born 1953 in Portland, Oregon) is an American software engineer and consultant in object-oriented programming and object-oriented design, the founder of the information technology consulting firm Wirfs-Brock Associates, and inventor of Responsibility-Driven Design, the first behavioral approach to object design.

== Career ==
Wirfs-Brock holds a B.A. in computer and information science and psychology from the University of Oregon. She worked at Tektronix for 15 years as a software engineer before moving on to Instantiations (founded by her husband Allen Wirfs-Brock), which was acquired by Digitalk which merged with Parc Place Systems to become ParcPlace-Digitalk in 1995. She was the Chief Technologist for the professional services organization of a Smalltalk language vendor.

She holds a U.S. Patent #4,635,049 "Apparatus for Presenting Image Information for Display Graphically" together with Warren Dodge.

Wirfs-Brock first coined the "-driven" meme in an OOPSLA 1989 paper she co-authored with Brian Wilkerson. Before that time, the most prevalent way of structuring objects was based on entity-relationship modeling ideas (popularized by James Rumbaugh, Steve Mellor and Sally Shlaer).

She wrote about object role stereotypes in 1992 in a Smalltalk Report article and this influenced the UML notion of stereotypes. Her invention of the conversational (two-column) form of use cases was then popularized by Larry Constantine. Most of the more recent "driven" design approaches acknowledge their roots and the influence of RDD, of which class-responsibility-collaboration cards are one popular technique. She was the design columnist for IEEE Software until December 2009.

== Bibliography ==
- Designing Object-Oriented Software, with Brian Wilkerson and Lauren Wiener, Prentice-Hall, 1990, ISBN 0-13-629825-7
- Object Design: Roles, Responsibilities, and Collaborations, with Alan McKean. Addison-Wesley, 2003, ISBN 0-201-37943-0
