= Algoid (programming language) =

Algoid is an educational programming language developed around 2012, by Yann Caron a student of computer science at CNAM, (Conservatoire national des arts et métiers at Paris)

== Features ==
Algoid is an educational language that allows the student to use different paradigms:

- Imperative
- Procedural
- Functional
- Recursive
- Object-oriented (multi-inheritance)
- Aspect-oriented programming.

It leads onto programming in industry standard language (such as C, Java and C++) and its syntax as close as possible to their respective syntaxes. It implements powerful idioms like meta-object protocol (from python) and cascade (from smalltalk).

To do this, the fundamental principles of Algoid are:

- A function is an expression.
- An object is an expression.
- An expression is an object.
- So a function is a meta-function and an object is a meta-object.
