= Bennett M. Berger =

American sociologist

Bennett M. Berger was an American sociologist.

Berger died from pancreatic cancer in La Jolla, California, on November 10, 2005, at the age of 79.

== Books ==
- Authors of Their Own Lives. Intellectual Autobiographies of Twenty American Sociologists
- Working-Class Suburb: A Study of Auto Workers in Suburbia
- An Essay on Culture: Symbolic Structure and Social Structure
- The Survival of a counterculture
- Looking for America: essays on youth, suburbia, and other American obsessions
