= Barbara Gastel =

American physician and writer

Barbara Gastel is an American physician and writer. She has taught at the Texas A&M University and edited the Council of Science Editors' Science Editor journal. Gastel is the author of Presenting science to the public Medical Editing: A Guide to Learning the Craft and Building Your Career. She is a fellow of the American Association for the Advancement of Science and a recipient of Sigma Xi's John P. McGovern Science and Society Award.
