= Method chaining =

Programming syntax of chaining multiple method calls

Method chaining is a common syntax for invoking multiple method calls in object-oriented programming languages. Each method returns an object, allowing the calls to be chained together in a single statement without requiring variables to store the intermediate results.

== Rationale ==
Local variable declarations are syntactic sugar.

Method chaining eliminates an extra variable for each intermediate step. The developer is saved from the cognitive burden of naming the variable and keeping the variable in mind.

Method chaining has been referred to as producing a "train wreck" due to the increase in the number of methods that come one after another in the same line that occurs as more methods are chained together.

A similar syntax is method cascading, where after the method call the expression evaluates to the current object, not the return value of the method. Cascading can be implemented using method chaining by having the method return the current object itself. Cascading is a key technique in fluent interfaces, and since chaining is widely implemented in object-oriented languages while cascading isn't, this form of "cascading-by-chaining by returning this" is often referred to simply as "chaining". Both chaining and cascading come from the Simula language.

While chaining is syntax, it has semantic consequences, namely that requires methods to return an object, and if implementing cascading via chaining, this must be the current object. This prevents the return value from being used for some other purpose, such as returning an error value.

== Examples ==
=== iostreams (C++) ===
A common example is C++'s stream-based I/O libraries (sometimes called "iostreams"), all of which descend from std::ios_base. Two operators are defined in the hierarchy: operator>>, which comes from std::basic_istream (and in particular its common form std::istream), and operator<<, which comes from std::basic_ostream (and in particular its common form std::ostream). These operators are defined to return the instance of the object, allowing chaining.

// Let 's' be some std::ostream object
s << a << b;

// this is equivalent to:
s << a;
s << b;

=== Functional programming ===
Functional programming is another example of the usage of method chaining, involving higher-order functions. In object-oriented programming, higher-order functions and manipulation of collections can be represented through methods that are chained together.

One such example in Java uses the built-in methods of java.util.stream.Stream:

import java.util.Arrays;
import java.util.List;
import java.util.streams.Collectors;

List<Integer> numbers = Arrays.asList(10, 25, 30, 45, 60, 75, 90);

List<Integer> result = numbers.stream() // .stream() returns java.util.stream.Stream
    .filter(n -> n > 30)
    .map(n -> n * 2)       
    .sorted()
    .collect(Collectors.toList());

Note that in Java, filter(), map(), and sorted() return a new shallow copy of the preceding list. However, to operate on the list in-place, the sort() method can be used.

Language Integrated Query (or LINQ) for C# makes extensive usage of method chaining.

using System;
using System.Collections;

// using method chaining:
IEnumerble<Foo> results = list
    .Where(x => x.Bar < 10)
    .Select(x => new {x.Bar, x.Qux});

results.ForEach(x => { Console.WriteLine(x.ToString()); });

// using LINQ keywords:
IEnumerable<Foo> results = from x in list
    where x.Bar < 10
    select new {x.Bar, x.Qux};

foreach (Foo result in results)
{
    Console.WriteLine(result);
}

C++20 utilized operator| as a "piping operator" for LINQ-style chaining operations with the std::ranges library. std::views contains several classes which are invoked through operator().

import std;

using std::vector;
using std::ranges::to;
using std::views::filter;
using std::views::transform;

vector<int> numbers = {1, 2, 3, 4, 5, 6, 7, 8, 9, 10};

// Pipeline: filter even numbers, double them, and then sum the result
vector<int> result = numbers
    | filter([](int n) -> bool { return n % 2 == 0; })
    | transform([](int n) -> int { return n * 2; })
    | to<vector>();

Similarly, the C++26 std::execution library (the execution or sender/receiver framework) builds asynchronous, data-parallel sender/receiver graphs through chaining of operator|:

import std;

using std::execution::just;
using std::execution::sender;
using std::execution::task;
using std::execution::then;

task<int> computeAnswer() {
    sender auto work = just(6)
        | then([](int x) -> int { return x * 7; })
        | then([](int x) -> int {
            std::println("Result after multiplying by 7: {}", x);
            return x;
        });

    int answer = co_await std::move(work);
    co_return answer;
}

=== Design patterns ===
The Builder pattern relies on constructing an object through method calls rather than immediately in its constructor. For example, java.lang.StringBuilder makes use method chaining to build a java.lang.StringBuilder, which is finally turned back to a java.lang.String through a toString() call.

String result = new StringBuilder()
    .append("Hello, ")
    .append("world!")
    .insert(0, "Greeting: ")
    .replace(10, 18, "beautiful ")
    .toString();

The Fluent interface pattern relies entirely on method chaining to implement method cascading.

In C++, similar method chaining to Java and C# can be accomplished by having the methods return (for example, for a class StringBuilder, append() and replace() could have type StringBuilder& and return *this). However, in C++ it is important to be conscious of potential object slicing if the returned reference is to a parent class, while other languages such as Java, C#, and Rust are not subject to this problem.

== See also ==
- Fluent interface
- Pipeline (Unix)
- Nesting (computing)
- Builder pattern
- Pyramid of doom (programming)
