= Fluent interface =

Software engineering object-oriented API

In software engineering, a fluent interface is an object-oriented API whose design relies extensively on method chaining. Its goal is to increase code legibility by creating a domain-specific language (DSL). The term was coined in 2005 by Eric Evans and Martin Fowler.

== Implementation ==
A fluent interface is commonly implemented through method chaining to achieve method cascading in languages that do not provide cascading natively. This is typically done by having each method return the object on which it was invoked, often referred to as this or self. More abstractly, a fluent interface maintains the instruction context of a subsequent call within a chain, where the context is generally:

- defined through the return value of the preceding method,
- self-referential, where the new context is equivalent to the previous one,
- or terminated by returning a void context.

A fluent interface involves more than method chaining alone; it also entails designing the API so that chained calls read like a domain-specific language (DSL), often incorporating techniques such as nested functions and careful object scoping.

== History ==
The term "fluent interface" was coined in late 2005, though this overall style of interface dates to the invention of method cascading in Smalltalk in the 1970s, and numerous examples in the 1980s. A common example is the iostream library in C++, which uses the << or >> operators for the message passing, sending multiple data to the same object and allowing "manipulators" for other method calls. Other early examples include the Garnet system (from 1988 in Lisp) and the Amulet system (from 1994 in C++) which used this style for object creation and property assignment.

== Examples ==
=== C# ===
C# uses fluent programming extensively in LINQ to build queries using "standard query operators". The implementation is based on extension methods.

using System.Collections.Generic;

// An English-to-French dictionary of animal names
Dictionary<string, string> translations = new()
{
    {"cat", "chat"},
    {"dog", "chien"},
    {"fish", "poisson"},
    {"bird", "oiseau"}
};

// Find translations for English words containing the letter "a",
// sorted by length and displayed in uppercase
IEnumerable<string> query = translations
	.Where(t => t.Key.Contains("a"))
	.OrderBy(t => t.Value.Length)
	.Select(t => t.Value.ToUpper());

// The same query constructed progressively:
IEnumerable<string> filtered = translations.Where(t => t.Key.Contains("a"));
IEnumerable<string> sorted = filtered.OrderBy(t => t.Value.Length);
IEnumerable<string> finalQuery = sorted.Select(t => t.Value.ToUpper());

Fluent interface can also be used to chain a set of methods, which operate on/share the same object. Instead of creating a customer class, we can create a data context which can be decorated with fluent interface as follows.

// Defines the data context
class Context
{
    public string FirstName { get; set; }
    public string LastName { get; set; }
    public string Sex { get; set; }
    public string Address { get; set; }
}

class Customer
{
    private Context _context = new(); // Initializes the context

    // set the value for properties
    public Customer FirstName(string firstName)
    {
        _context.FirstName = firstName;
        return this;
    }

    public Customer LastName(string lastName)
    {
        _context.LastName = lastName;
        return this;
    }

    public Customer Sex(string sex)
    {
        _context.Sex = sex;
        return this;
    }

    public Customer Address(string address)
    {
        _context.Address = address;
        return this;
    }

    // Prints the data to console
    public void Print()
    {
        Console.WriteLine($"First name: {_context.FirstName} \nLast name: {_context.LastName} \nSex: {_context.Sex} \nAddress: {_context.Address}");
    }
}

class Program
{
    static void Main(string[] args)
    {
        // Object creation
        Customer c1 = new();
        // Using the method chaining to assign & print data with a single line
        c1.FirstName("John")
            .LastName("Doe")
            .Sex("Male")
            .Address("123 Example St, Orlando FL 12345")
            .Print();
    }
}

The .NET testing framework NUnit uses a mix of C#'s methods and properties in a fluent style to construct its "constraint based" assertions:

using System;

Assert.That(() => 2 * 2, Is.AtLeast(3).And.AtMost(5));

=== C++ ===
One of the most prominent uses of the fluent design in C++ are iostreams, which used chained overloaded operators for operator>> and operator<<.

In this example which demonstrates the builder pattern, the class Computer has an internal Builder class used to construct a Computer through a fluent API, while making the constructor private and having the build() method return a smart pointer to the Computer object.

import std;

using std::string;
using std::unique_ptr;

class Computer {
private:
    string cpu;
    string gpu;
    int ram; // default value
    int storage; // default value

    Computer(string cpu, string gpu, int ram, int storage):
        cpu{std::move(cpu)}, gpu{std::move(gpu)}, ram{ram}, storage{storage} {}
public:
    ~Computer() = default;

    void showSpecs() {
        std::println("Computer specs:");
        std::println("  CPU: {}", cpu);
        std::println("  GPU: {}", gpu);
        std::println("  RAM: {} GB", ram);
        std::println("  Storage: {} GB", storage);
    }

    class Builder {
    private:
        // Builder is given default parameters
        string cpu = "Generic CPU";
        string gpu = "Integrated Graphics";
        int ram = 16;
        int storage = 512;
    public:
        Builder() = default;

        Builder& ofCpu(string cpu) noexcept {
            this->cpu = std::move(cpu);
            return *this;
        }

        Builder& ofGpu(string gpu) noexcept {
            this->gpu = std::move(gpu);
            return *this;
        }

        Builder& withRam(int gb) noexcept {
            ram = gb;
            return *this;
        }

        Builder& withStorage(int gb) noexcept {
            storage = gb;
            return *this;
        }

        unique_ptr<Computer> build() {
            return unique_ptr<Computer>(new Computer(cpu, gpu, ram, storage));
        }
    };
};

int main() {
    unique_ptr<Computer> myComputer = Computer::Builder()
        .ofCpu("AMD Ryzen 7")
        .ofGpu("NVIDIA RTX 4070")
        .withRam(32)
        .withStorage(1000)
        .build();

    myComputer->showSpecs();
}

C++20 std::views and C++26 std::execution make use of chained operator|, resembling pipelines.

import std;

using std::vector;
using std::ranges::to;
using std::views::filter;
using std::views::transform;

vector<int> numbers = {1, 2, 3, 4, 5, 6, 7, 8, 9, 10};

// Pipeline: filter even numbers, double them, and then sum the result
vector<int> result = numbers
    | filter([](int n) -> bool { return n % 2 == 0; })
    | transform([](int n) -> int { return n * 2; })
    | to<vector>();

=== Java ===
Fluent interfaces can be used in Java APIs. They are present in both user-created libraries and the standard library.

An example of a fluent test expectation in the jMock testing framework is:

mock.expects(once()).method("m").with( or(stringContains("hello"),
                                          stringContains("howdy")) );

The jOOQ library models SQL as a fluent API in Java:

Author author = AUTHOR.as("author");
create.selectFrom(author)
      .where(exists(selectOne()
                   .from(BOOK)
                   .where(BOOK.STATUS.eq(BOOK_STATUS.SOLD_OUT))
                   .and(BOOK.AUTHOR_ID.eq(author.ID))
      )
);

The fluflu annotation processor enables the creation of a fluent API using Java annotations.

The JaQue library enables Java 8 Lambdas to be represented as objects in the form of expression trees at runtime, making it possible to create type-safe fluent interfaces, i.e., instead of:

Customer customer = new Customer();
customer.property("name").eq("John")

One can write:

method<Customer>(customer -> customer.getName() == "John")

Also, the mock object testing library EasyMock makes extensive use of this style of interface to provide an expressive programming interface.

Collection mockCollection = EasyMock.createMock(Collection.class);
EasyMock
    .expect(mockCollection.remove(null))
    .andThrow(new NullPointerException())
    .atLeastOnce();

As for the standard library, the java.nio buffer classes provide fluent interfaces for writing data:

ByteBuffer buffer = ByteBuffer.allocate(12);
buffer
    .putDouble(1.0)
    .putDouble(2.0)
    .putDouble(3.0);

=== JavaScript/TypeScript ===
There are many examples of JavaScript libraries that use some variant of this: jQuery probably being the most well known. Typically, fluent builders are used to implement "database queries", for example in the Dynamite client library:

// getting an item from a table
client.getItem('user-table')
    .setHashKey('userId', 'userA')
    .setRangeKey('column', '@')
    .execute()
    .then(function(data) {
        // data.result: the resulting object
    })

A simple way to do this is using prototype inheritance and this, such as in this TypeScript example:

// example from https://schier.co/blog/2013/11/14/method-chaining-in-javascript.html

class Kitten {
  public name: string;
  public color: string;

  constructor() {
    this.name = 'Garfield';
    this.color = 'orange';
  }

  public setName(name: string): this {
    this.name = name;
    return this;
  }

  public setColor(color: string): this {
    this.color = color;
    return this;
  }

  public save(): this {
    console.log(`saving ${this.name}, the ${this.color} kitten`);
    return this;
  }
}

// use it
let salem = new Kitten()
  .setName('Salem')
  .setColor('black')
  .save();

=== Scala ===
Scala supports a fluent syntax for both method calls and class mixins, using traits and the with keyword. For example:

class Color { def rgb(): Tuple3[Decimal] }
object Black extends Color { override def rgb(): Tuple3[Decimal] = ("0", "0", "0"); }

trait GUIWindow {
  // Rendering methods that return this for fluent drawing
  def set_pen_color(color: Color): this.type
  def move_to(pos: Position): this.type
  def line_to(pos: Position, end_pos: Position): this.type

  def render(): this.type = this // Don't draw anything, just return this, for child implementations to use fluently

  def top_left(): Position
  def bottom_left(): Position
  def top_right(): Position
  def bottom_right(): Position
}

trait WindowBorder extends GUIWindow {
  def render(): GUIWindow = {
    super.render()
      .move_to(top_left())
      .set_pen_color(Black)
      .line_to(top_right())
      .line_to(bottom_right())
      .line_to(bottom_left())
      .line_to(top_left())
   }
}

class SwingWindow extends GUIWindow { ... }

val appWin = new SwingWindow() with WindowBorder
appWin.render()

=== Raku ===
In Raku, there are many approaches, but one of the simplest is to declare attributes as read/write and use the given keyword. The type annotations are optional, but the native gradual typing makes it much safer to write directly to public attributes.

class Employee {
    subset Salary         of Real where * > 0;
    subset NonEmptyString of Str  where * ~~ /\S/; # at least one non-space character

    has NonEmptyString $.name    is rw;
    has NonEmptyString $.surname is rw;
    has Salary         $.salary  is rw;

    method gist {
        return qq:to[END];
        Name:    $.name
        Surname: $.surname
        Salary:  $.salary
        END
    }
}
my $employee = Employee.new();

given $employee {
    .name    = 'Sally';
    .surname = 'Ride';
    .salary  = 200;
}

say $employee;

# Output:
# Name:    Sally
# Surname: Ride
# Salary:  200

=== PHP ===
In PHP, one can return the current object by using the $this special variable which represent the instance. Hence return $this; will make the method return the instance. The example below defines a class Employee and three methods to set its name, surname and salary. Each return the instance of the Employee class allowing to chain methods.

<?php declare(strict_types=1);

final class Employee
{
    private string $name;
    private string $surname; 
    private string $salary;

    public function setName(string $name): self
    {
        $this->name = $name;

        return $this;
    }

    public function setSurname(string $surname): self
    {
        $this->surname = $surname;

        return $this;
    }

    public function setSalary(string $salary): self
    {
        $this->salary = $salary;

        return $this;
    }

    public function __toString(): string
    {
        return <<<INFO
        Name: {$this->name}
        Surname: {$this->surname}
        Salary: {$this->salary}
        INFO;
    }
}

# Create a new instance of the Employee class, Tom Smith, with a salary of 100:
$employee = (new Employee())
    ->setName('Tom')
    ->setSurname('Smith')
    ->setSalary('100');

# Display the value of the Employee instance:
echo $employee;

# Display:
# Name: Tom
# Surname: Smith
# Salary: 100

=== Python ===
In Python, returning self in the instance method is one way to implement the fluent pattern.

It is however discouraged by the language’s creator, Guido van Rossum, and therefore considered unpythonic (not idiomatic) for operations that do not return new values. Van Rossum provides string processing operations as example where he sees the fluent pattern appropriate.

class Poem:
    def __init__(self, title: str) -> None:
        self.title = title

    def indent(self, spaces: int) -> Self:
        """Indent the poem with the specified number of spaces."""
        self.title = " " * spaces + self.title
        return self

    def suffix(self, author: str) -> Self:
        """Suffix the poem with the author name."""
        self.title = f"{self.title} - {author}"
        return self

>>> Poem("Road Not Travelled").indent(4).suffix("Robert Frost").title
'    Road Not Travelled - Robert Frost'

=== Swift ===
In Swift 3.0+ returning self in the functions is one way to implement the fluent pattern.

class Person {
    var firstname: String = ""
    var lastname: String = ""
    var favoriteQuote: String = ""

    @discardableResult
    func set(firstname: String) -> Self {
        self.firstname = firstname
        return self
    }

    @discardableResult
    func set(lastname: String) -> Self {
        self.lastname = lastname
        return self
    }

    @discardableResult
    func set(favoriteQuote: String) -> Self {
        self.favoriteQuote = favoriteQuote
        return self
    }
}

let person = Person()
    .set(firstname: "John")
    .set(lastname: "Doe")
    .set(favoriteQuote: "I like turtles")

== Immutability ==
It is possible to create immutable fluent interfaces that utilise copy-on-write semantics. In this variation of the pattern, instead of modifying internal properties and returning a reference to the same object, the object is instead cloned, with properties changed on the cloned object, and that object returned.

The benefit of this approach is that the interface can be used to create configurations of objects that can fork off from a particular point; Allowing two or more objects to share a certain amount of state, and be used further without interfering with each other.

=== JavaScript example ===
Using copy-on-write semantics, the TypeScript example from above becomes:

class Kitten {
  public name: string;
  public color: string;

  constructor() {
    this.name = 'Garfield';
    this.color = 'orange';
  }

  public setName(name: string): Kitten {
    const copy = new Kitten();
    copy.color = this.color;
    copy.name = name;
    return copy;
  }

  public setColor(color: string): Kitten {
    const copy = new Kitten();
    copy.name = this.name;
    copy.color = color;
    return copy;
  }

  // ...
}

// use it
const kitten1 = new Kitten().setName('Salem');

const kitten2 = kitten1.setColor('black');

console.log(kitten1, kitten2);
// -> Kitten({ name: 'Salem', color: 'orange' }), Kitten({ name: 'Salem', color: 'black' })

== Problems ==
=== Errors cannot be captured at compile time ===
In typed languages, using a constructor requiring all parameters will fail at compilation time while the fluent approach will only be able to generate runtime errors, missing all the type-safety checks of modern compilers. It also contradicts the "fail-fast" approach for error protection.

=== Debugging and error reporting ===
Single-line chained statements may be more difficult to debug as debuggers may not be able to set breakpoints within the chain. Stepping through a single-line statement in a debugger may also be less convenient.

import java.nio.Buffer;

ByteBuffer.allocate(10).rewind().limit(100);

Another issue is that it may not be clear which of the method calls caused an exception, in particular if there are multiple calls to the same method. These issues can be overcome by breaking the statement into multiple lines which preserves readability while allowing the user to set breakpoints within the chain and to easily step through the code line by line:

import java.nio.Buffer;

ByteBuffer
    .allocate(10)
    .rewind()
    .limit(100);

However, some debuggers always show the first line in the exception backtrace, although the exception has been thrown on any line.

=== Logging ===
Adding logging into the middle of a chain of fluent calls can be an issue. E.g., given:

import java.nio.Buffer;

ByteBuffer buffer = ByteBuffer.allocate(10).rewind().limit(100);

To log the state of buffer after the rewind() method call, it is necessary to break the fluent calls:

import java.nio.Buffer;

ByteBuffer buffer = ByteBuffer.allocate(10).rewind();
System.out.println("First byte after rewind is " + buffer.get(0));
buffer.limit(100);

This can be worked around in languages that support extension methods by defining a new extension to wrap the desired logging functionality, for example in C# (using the same Java ByteBuffer example as above):

using System;

static class ByteBufferExtensions
{
    public static ByteBuffer Log(this ByteBuffer buffer, Log log, Action<ByteBuffer> getMessage)
    {
        string message = getMessage(buffer);
        log.debug(message);
        return buffer;
    } 
}

// Usage:
ByteBuffer
    .Allocate(10)
    .Rewind()
    .Log(log, b => "First byte after rewind is " + b.Get(0))
    .Limit(100);

=== Subclasses ===
Subclasses in strongly typed languages (C++, Java, C#, etc.) often have to override all methods from their superclass that participate in a fluent interface in order to change their return type. For example:

class A {
    public A foo() { 
        // ... 
    }
}

class B extends A {
    public B foo() { 
        super.foo(); 
        return this; 
    } // Must change return type to B.

    public B bar() { 
        // ... 
    }
}
...
A a = new B().bar().foo(); // This would work even without overriding A.foo().
B b = new B().foo().bar(); // This would fail if A.foo() wasn't overridden.

Languages that are capable of expressing F-bound polymorphism can use it to avoid this difficulty. For example:

abstract class AbstractA<T extends AbstractA<T>> {
	@SuppressWarnings("unchecked")
	public T foo() { 
        // ... 
        return (T)this; 
    }
}

class A extends AbstractA<A> {}
	
class B extends AbstractA<B> {
	public B bar() {
        // ... 
        return this; 
    }
}

...
B b = new B().foo().bar(); // OK
A a = new A().foo(); // Also OK

Note that in order to be able to create instances of the parent class, we had to split it into two classes — AbstractA and A, the latter with no content (it would only contain constructors if those were needed). The approach can easily be extended if we want to have sub-subclasses (etc.) too:

abstract class AbstractB<T extends AbstractB<T>> extends AbstractA<T> {
	@SuppressWarnings("unchecked")
	public T bar() { 
        // ...
        return (T)this; 
    }
}
class B extends AbstractB<B> {}

abstract class AbstractC<T extends AbstractC<T>> extends AbstractB<T> {
	@SuppressWarnings("unchecked")
	public T baz() {
        // ...
        return (T)this; 
    }
}
class C extends AbstractC<C> {}
...
C c = new C().foo().bar().baz(); // OK
B b = new B().foo().bar(); // Also OK

In a dependently typed language, e.g. Scala, methods can also be explicitly defined as always returning this and thus can be defined only once for subclasses to take advantage of the fluent interface:

class A {
    def foo(): this.type = { ... } // returns this, and always this.
}
class B extends A{
    // No override needed!
    def bar(): this.type = { ... }
}
...
val a: A = new B().bar().foo(); // Chaining works in both directions
val b: B = new B().foo().bar(); // And, both method chains result in a B

== See also ==
- Command-query separation
- Method chaining
- Named parameter
- Pipeline (Unix)
