= Connascence =

Software quality metric

Connascence is a software design metric introduced by Meilir Page-Jones that quantifies the degree and type of dependency between software components, evaluating their strength (difficulty of change) and locality (proximity in the codebase). It can be categorized as static (analyzable at compile-time) or dynamic (detectable at runtime) and includes forms such as Connascence of Name, Type, and Position, each representing different dependency characteristics and levels of fragility.

== Coupling vs Connascence ==
Coupling describes the degree and nature of dependency between software components, focusing on what they share (e.g., data, control flow, technology) and how tightly they are bound. It evaluates two key dimensions: strength, which measures how difficult it is to change the dependency, and scope (or visibility), which indicates how widely the dependency is exposed across modules or boundaries. Traditional coupling types typically include content coupling, common coupling, control coupling, stamp coupling, external coupling, and data coupling.

Connascence, introduced by Meilir Page-Jones, provides a systematic framework for analyzing and measuring coupling dependencies. It evaluates dependencies based on three dimensions: strength, which measures the effort required to refactor or modify the dependency; locality, which considers how physically or logically close dependent components are in the codebase; and degree, which measures how many components are affected by the dependency. Connascence can be categorized into static (detectable at compile-time) and dynamic (detectable at runtime) forms. Static connascence refers to compile-time dependencies, such as method signatures, while dynamic connascence refers to runtime dependencies, which can manifest in forms like connascence of timing, values, or algorithm.

Each coupling flavor can exhibit multiple types of connascence, a specific type, or, in rare cases, none at all, depending on how the dependency is implemented. Common types of connascence include connascence of name, type, position, and meaning. Certain coupling types naturally align with specific connascence types; for example, data coupling often involves connascence of name or type. However, not every combination of coupling and connascence is practically meaningful. Dependencies relying on parameter order in a method signature demonstrate connascence of position, which is fragile and difficult to refactor because reordering parameters breaks the interface. In contrast, connascence of name, which relies on field or parameter names, is generally more resilient to change. Connascence types themselves exhibit a natural hierarchy of strength, with connascence of name typically considered weaker than connascence of meaning.

Dependencies spanning module boundaries or distributed systems typically have higher coordination costs, increasing the difficulty of refactoring and propagating changes across distant boundaries. Modern practices, such as dependency injection and interface-based programming, are often employed to reduce coupling strength and improve the maintainability of dependencies.

While coupling identifies what is shared between components, connascence evaluates how those dependencies behave, how changes propagate, and how difficult they are to refactor. Strength, locality, and degree are interrelated; dependencies with high strength, wide scope, and spanning distant boundaries are significantly harder to refactor and maintain. Together, coupling provides a high-level overview of dependency relationships, while connascence offers a granular framework for analyzing dependency strength, locality, degree, and resilience to change, supporting the design of maintainable and robust systems.
