= Information hiding =

Principle of computer program design

In computer science, information hiding is the principle of segregation of the design decisions in a computer program that are most likely to change, thus protecting other parts of the program from extensive modification if the design decision is changed. The protection involves providing a stable interface which protects the remainder of the program from the implementation (whose details are likely to change). Written in another way, information hiding is the ability to prevent certain aspects of a class or software component from being accessible to its clients, using either programming language features (like private variables) or an explicit exporting policy.

== Overview ==
The term encapsulation is often used interchangeably with information hiding. Not all agree on the distinctions between the two, though; one may think of information hiding as being the principle and encapsulation being the technique. A software module hides information by encapsulating the information into a module or other construct which presents an interface.

A common use of information hiding is to hide the physical storage layout for data so that if it is changed, the change is restricted to a small subset of the total program. For example, if a three-dimensional point (x, y, z) is represented in a program with three floating-point scalar variables and later, the representation is changed to a single array variable of size three, a module designed with information hiding in mind would protect the remainder of the program from such a change.

In object-oriented programming, information hiding (by way of nesting of types) reduces software development risk by shifting the code's dependency on an uncertain implementation (design decision) onto a well-defined interface. Clients of the interface perform operations purely through the interface, so, if the implementation changes, the clients do not have to change.

== Encapsulation ==
In his book on object-oriented design, Grady Booch defined encapsulation as "the process of compartmentalizing the elements of an abstraction that constitute its structure and behavior; encapsulation serves to separate the contractual interface of an abstraction and its implementation."

The purpose is to achieve the potential for change: the internal mechanisms of the component can be improved without impact on other components, or the component can be replaced with a different one that supports the same public interface. Encapsulation also protects the integrity of the component, by preventing users from setting the internal data of the component into an invalid or inconsistent state. Another benefit of encapsulation is that it reduces system complexity and thus increases robustness, by limiting the interdependencies between software components.

In this sense, the idea of encapsulation is more general than how it is applied in object-oriented programming. For example, a relational database is encapsulated in the sense that its only public interface is a query language (such as SQL), which hides all the internal machinery and data structures of the database management system. As such, encapsulation is a core principle of good software architecture, at every level of granularity.

Encapsulating software behind an interface allows the construction of objects that mimic the behavior and interactions of objects in the real world. For example, a simple digital alarm clock is a real-world object that a layperson (nonexpert) can use and understand. They can understand what the alarm clock does, and how to use it through the provided interface (buttons and screen), without having to understand every part inside of the clock. Similarly, if the clock were replaced by a different model, the layperson could continue to use it in the same way, provided that the interface works the same.

In the more concrete setting of an object-oriented programming language, the notion is used to mean either an information hiding mechanism, a bundling mechanism, or the combination of the two. (See Encapsulation (object-oriented programming) for details.)

== History ==
The concept of information hiding was first described by David Parnas in 1972. Before then, modularity was discussed by Richard Gauthier and Stephen Pont in their 1970 book Designing Systems Programs although modular programming itself had been used at many commercial sites for many years previously – especially in I/O sub-systems and software libraries – without acquiring the 'information hiding' tag – but for similar reasons, as well as the more obvious code reuse reason.

== See also ==
- Implementation inheritance
- Inheritance semantics
- Modularity (programming)
- Opaque data type
- Virtual inheritance
- Transparency (human–computer interaction)
- Scope (programming)
- Compartmentalization (information security)
- Law of Demeter
