= Distributed object =

Concept in distributed computing

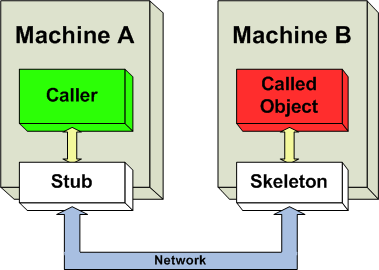
Image describes communication between distributed objects residing in different machines.

In distributed computing, distributed objects are objects (in the sense of object-oriented programming) that are distributed across different address spaces, either in different processes on the same computer, or even in multiple computers connected via a network, but which work together by sharing data and invoking methods. This often involves location transparency, where remote objects appear the same as local objects. The main method of distributed object communication is with remote method invocation, generally by message-passing: one object sends a message to another object in a remote machine or process to perform some task. The results are sent back to the calling object.

Distributed objects were popular in the late 1990s and early 2000s, but have since fallen out of favor.

The term may also generally refer to one of the extensions of the basic object concept used in the context of distributed computing, such as replicated objects or live distributed objects.

- Replicated objects are groups of software components (replicas) that run a distributed multi-party protocol to achieve a high degree of consistency between their internal states, and that respond to requests in a coordinated manner. Referring to the group of replicas jointly as an object reflects the fact that interacting with any of them exposes the same externally visible state and behavior.
- Live distributed objects (or simply live objects) generalize the replicated object concept to groups of replicas that might internally use any distributed protocol, perhaps resulting in only a weak consistency between their local states. Live distributed objects can also be defined as running instances of distributed multi-party protocols, viewed from the object-oriented perspective as entities that have a distinct identity, and that can encapsulate distributed state and behavior.

See also Internet protocol suite.

== Local vs. distributed objects ==
Local and distributed objects differ in many respects. Here are some of them:

1. Life cycle : Creation, migration and deletion of distributed objects is different from local objects
2. Reference : Remote references to distributed objects are more complex than simple pointers to memory addresses
3. Request Latency : A distributed object request is orders of magnitude slower than local method invocation
4. Object Activation : Distributed objects may not always be available to serve an object request at any point in time
5. Parallelism : Distributed objects may be executed in parallel.
6. Communication : There are different communication primitives available for distributed objects requests
7. Failure : Distributed objects have far more points of failure than typical local objects.
8. Security : Distribution makes them vulnerable to attack.

== Examples ==
The RPC facilities of the cross platform serialization protocol, Cap'n Proto amount to a distributed object protocol. Distributed object method calls can be executed (chained, in a single network request, if needs be) through interface references/capabilities.

Distributed objects are implemented in Objective-C using the Cocoa API with the NSConnection class and supporting objects.

Distributed objects are used in Java RMI.

CORBA lets one build distributed mixed object systems.

DCOM is a framework for distributed objects on the Microsoft platform.

DDObjects is a framework for distributed objects using Borland Delphi.

Jt is a framework for distributed components using a messaging paradigm.

JavaSpaces is a Sun specification for a distributed, shared memory (space based)

Pyro is a framework for distributed objects using the Python programming language.

Distributed Ruby (DRb) is a framework for distributed objects using the Ruby programming language.

== See also ==
- Fragmented object
- Distributed object communication
- Object request broker
