= Test Double (company) =

Remote software consultancy in Columbus, Ohio

- Type: Private (employee-owned)
- Industry: Software consulting
- Founded: 2011; 15 years ago
- Founders: Todd Kaufman; Justin Searls
- Headquarters: Columbus, Ohio, United States
- Services: Software development consulting, product management consulting
- Website: testdouble.com

Test Double is an American software consulting company headquartered in Columbus, Ohio. Founded in 2011 by developers Todd Kaufman and Justin Searls, the firm has operated as a fully remote company since its founding and has been wholly owned by its employees through an employee stock ownership plan (ESOP) since 2020.

== History ==
Kaufman and Searls founded Test Double in 2011 as a software development consultancy. The company operated without a central office, with consultants working remotely and embedding with client engineering teams.

In April 2020, Kaufman and Searls sold the company to its employees by converting to an employee stock ownership plan. At the time of the conversion, the firm had grown to approximately 50 employees. The transaction cost employees nothing, and both founders remained in their leadership roles.

In November 2023, Test Double acquired Pathfinder Product, a Columbus-based product management consultancy founded by Brett Buchanan, adding product management consulting to its software development services. Buchanan continued to lead the Pathfinder unit following the acquisition.

== Open-source software ==
Test Double maintains several open-source projects, including testdouble.js, a mocking library for JavaScript testing. The library has been reviewed in the technology press as an alternative to Sinon.JS, with a simplified API and terminology intended to reduce confusion among the traditional categories of test doubles.

== Recognition ==
Test Double appeared on the Inc. 5000 list of fastest-growing private companies in the United States each year from 2016 through 2023, with its highest ranking of No. 674 in 2016. The company has also been named repeatedly to Columbus Business First's Fast 50 list of the fastest-growing private companies in central Ohio.

In 2024, Test Double was included on the Tugboat Institute's inaugural Best Evergreen Companies list, which recognizes private, purpose-driven companies.
