= DGC =

DGC can refer to:

== Businesses and organizations ==
- Darlton Gliding Club, Nottinghamshire, England
- Daybreak Game Company, an American video game developer
- Delhi Golf Club, Delhi, India
- Deutsche Gesellschaft für Chronometrie, a German organization for the science, art and history of horology
- DGC Records, an American record label
- Directors Guild of Canada, a Canadian labour union
- Dubious Goals Committee, an association football committee, England
- Dublin Gospel Choir, an Irish gospel choir
- Durban Girls' College, Durban, South Africa

== Other uses ==
- DARPA Grand Challenge, a competition for American autonomous vehicles
- Denham Golf Club railway station, Buckinghamshire, England
- Di Gi Charat, a Japanese manga and anime series created by Koge-Donbo
- Digital gold currency, a form of digital currency
- Disc golf course
- Discontinuous gas exchange cycles
- Distributed garbage collection (in computing)
- Dystrophin-glycoprotein complex, aka DGC, DAGC, or dystrophin-associated (glyco)protein complex, connects myofibrils inside a muscle cell to the extracellular matrix, spanning the cell membrane
