= DIIOP =

For programming tools, Domino Internet Inter-ORB Protocol (DIIOP) is CORBA over IIOP for Lotus Domino. DIIOP allows external programs to attach to, and manipulate Domino databases. DIIOP is frequently used to allow Java-based and other non CORBA programs to connect to Lotus Domino.

== See also ==
- General Inter-ORB Protocol
- Object Management Group
