= TPP =

TPP may refer to:

== Science and technology ==
=== Chemistry ===
- Tripolyphosphate, a sodium salt of the polyphosphate penta-anion
- Thiamine pyrophosphate, an enzyme cofactor
- Tetraphenylporphyrin, a synthetic heterocyclic compound that resembles naturally occurring porphyrins
- Triphenylphosphine, an organophosphorus compound commonly used in chemical synthesis

=== Computing and mathematics ===
- Tangential proper part, a relation in region connection calculus
- Targeted projection pursuit, a statistical technique for data exploration, feature selection and information visualisation
- Transformation Priority Premise, a programming approach that simplifies test-driven development
- Traveling purchaser problem, an NP-hard problem generalizing the traveling salesman problem
- Trans-Proteomic Pipeline, open-source bioinformatics software

=== Energy ===
- Thermal power plant is a power station in which heat energy is converted to electric power.

=== Medicine ===
- Thrombotic thrombocytopenic purpura, a disorder of the blood-coagulation system
- Thyrotoxic periodic paralysis, a condition featuring attacks of muscle weakness in the presence of hyperthyroidism

== Entertainment ==
- Twitch Plays Pokémon, an interactive video channel
- Metal Gear Solid V: The Phantom Pain, a 2015 stealth video game
- Third-person perspective, a style of virtual camera system for 3D games

== Politics ==
- Trans-Pacific Partnership, a defunct proposed trade agreement between 12 Pacific Rim countries
  - Comprehensive and Progressive Agreement for Trans-Pacific Partnership, the successor agreement between all original TPP members except the United States
- Taiwan People's Party, a political party in Taiwan
- Two-party-preferred vote, a measure of election outcomes in Australia's preferential-voting system

== Other uses ==
- Cad. FAP Guillermo del Castillo Paredes Airport (IATA code), Peru
- Total Package Procurement, a former US military systems acquisition policy
- Chartered Transport planning professional (UK), a professional qualification for transport planners
- Terminal Procedures Publication, the U.S. Federal Aviation Administration's instrument approach procedure
- The Phoenix Partnership, a health software company
- The President's Pleasure (Singapore) (TPP), a legal punishment in Singapore, which serves as indefinite detention of minors or people or unsound mind for capital offences
- Techno Plastic Products AG (TPP), a Swiss manufacturer of plasticware and consumables for cell culture and life science research

== See also ==
- TPP Nikola Tesla, a power-plant complex in Serbia
