= GIOP =

GIOP may refer to:

- General Inter-ORB Protocol
- glucocorticoid-induced osteoporosis
