= Self-testing code =

Self-testing code is software that incorporates built-in tests (see test-first development).

Perl packages will run their self tests when they are installed using CPAN. This ensures that they run successfully in the local environment. (There is also a testing community that tests new packages and updated packages on many different platforms.)

In Java, to execute a unit test from the command line, a class can have methods like the following.

// Executing <code>main</code> runs the unit test.
public static void main(String[] args) {
    test();
}

static void test() {
    assert foo == bar;
}

To invoke a full system test, a class can incorporate a method call.

public static void main(String[] args) {
    test();
    TestSuite.test();    // invokes full system test
}

In addition, Java has some Jupiter API libraries for self-testing code. assert can be used in various ways such as assert equals, which checks if the given variable is equal to the value given.

@Test
void checkplayer() {
        Board board = new Board(10);
        board.addplayer(1);
        int check = board.getCurrentPlayer(1);
        assertEquals(1, check);

    }

== See also ==
- Software development
- Extreme programming
