= Stub (distributed computing) =

Piece of computer code

In distributed computing, a stub is a program that acts as a temporary replacement for a remote service or object. It allows the client application to access a service as if it were local, while hiding the details of the underlying network communication. This can simplify the development process, as the client application does not need to be aware of the complexities of distributed computing. Instead, it can rely on the stub to handle the remote communication, while providing a familiar interface for the developer to work with.

== Application ==
The stub represents a remote object or service on a local system. It acts as a proxy for the remote service and allows the client program to make method calls on the remote object as if it were local. In modern microservices architectures, stubs can also be used for service virtualization—allowing developers to test interactions between components without requiring the actual remote service to be running. The process of generating stubs involves creating a client-side proxy object that provides the same interface as the remote service, but routes method calls to the actual remote object.

In distributed computing, a stub is a piece of code that converts parameters passed between the client and server during a remote procedure call (RPC). The main purpose of an RPC is to allow a local computer (client) to invoke procedures on a remote computer (server). Since the client and server have different address spaces, the parameters used in a function call must be converted. Otherwise, the parameter values would be unusable because pointers to parameters in one computer's memory would reference different data on the other computer. Also, the client and server can have different data representations, even for simple parameters like integers (e.g., big-endian versus little-endian). Stubs handle parameter conversion, making a remote procedure call look like a local function call to the remote computer.

Stub libraries are crucial in distributed computing, as they allow for local procedure calls to be made to remote objects or services. The client-side stub or proxy is responsible for converting the parameters used in a function call and deconverting the results returned by the server after executing the function, a process known as marshalling. The stub libraries must be installed on both the client and server, with the server-side stub, or server skeleton, being responsible for deconverting the parameters passed by the client and converting the results after executing the function. In virtual testing environments, stubs are used to simulate distributed computing, allowing for more efficient and effective verification of software updates in variant-rich automotive systems.^{[4]}

== Examples of usage ==
=== Remote Procedure Call (RPC) frameworks ===
In classical RPC systems, the client uses a client-side stub (proxy) which packages the parameters of a call (marshalling) and sends them over the network. On the server side, a server-side stub (skeleton) unpacks the request (unmarshalling), invokes the procedure, and then sends the result back. This mechanism allows the client to call remote functions as if they were local.

=== Automatic stub generation (IDL-based) ===
Many RPC implementations use an Interface Definition Language (IDL) to describe services. The IDL compiler automatically generates both client and server stubs, including all necessary marshalling and unmarshalling operations.

=== gRPC ===
In gRPC, the client holds a local object called a stub, which implements the same methods as the remote service. When a method is invoked, the stub serializes the request into Protobuf, sends it to the server, and returns the structured response, making remote calls transparent to the client.

=== Java RMI ===
In Java Remote Method Invocation (RMI), stub classes are generated using the rmic compiler. The client interacts with these stub classes to invoke methods on remote objects as if they were local, while the underlying stub manages the network communication.

=== Distributed object systems ===
In distributed object communication (such as CORBA), stubs act as proxies for clients while server skeletons handle incoming requests. They are responsible for network communication, parameter marshalling, and method invocation.

== Steps to writing tests with stubs ==
To write tests with stubs, follow these steps:

1. Identify the external components or services that the component being tested relies on to function correctly.^{[2]} or manually create stubs versions of the dependencies that return predefined values or responses when called by the component under test.
2. Write test cases for the component, using the stubs instead of the actual dependencies.^{[2]}
3. Set up the test environment by initializing the component under test and its stubs.
4. Run the tests and analyze the results. If the tests fail, review the code and stubs to determine the cause of the issue.^{[2]}
5. Refactor the code and stubs as necessary to improve the quality of the tests and the component.^{[3]}

It's crucial to use stubs only when needed, as they may introduce additional complexity and maintenance overhead. Furthermore, the stubs should accurately mimic the behavior of the actual dependencies to avoid introducing false positives or negatives in the tests.^{[2]}
