= The Art of Unit Testing =

2009 book by Roy Osherove

The Art of Unit testing
- First edition
- Author: Roy Osherove
- Language: English
- Genre: Educational
- Published: 2013
- Publisher: Manning Publications
- Publication place: USA

The Art of Unit Testing is a 2009 book by Roy Osherove which covers unit test writing for software. It's written with .NET Framework examples, but the fundamentals can be applied by any developer.

The second edition was published in 2013. It has two additional chapters, as well as reorganization and updating of chapters from the first edition. The second edition is still in print and is available at the Manning Publications website.

== Reception ==
Reviews of both editions have been largely positive.

- Slashdot book review says that "Osherove's book has something for all readers, regardless of their experience with unit testing.".
- Ward Bell wrote "It just arrived and I read it in one sitting. I am so pleased that I did. I’ll quarrel with it... but do not let that deter you from rushing to buy your own copy."
