= Test stub =

A test stub is a test double that provides static values to the software under test.

A test stub provides canned answers to calls made during the test, usually not responding at all to anything outside what's programmed in for the test.

A stub may be coded by hand, generated via a tool or be created as a dedicated part of a larger system such as a stub server or service.

Stubs differ from mock objects, which assert and verify interactions. Stubs only supply data.

== See also ==
- Mock object
- Method stub
- Software testing
- Test Double
- Stub (distributed computing)
