= DDObjects =

DDObjects is a remoting framework for Borland Delphi and C++ Builder. A main goal while developing DDObjects has not been only to keep the code one has to implement in order to utilize DDObjects as simple as possible but also very close to Delphi's usual style of event-driven programming.

DDObjects supports remote method calls, server callbacks, asynchronous calls, asynchronous callbacks, stateful and less objects and other features. DDObjects doesn't mimic other implementations as DCOM or CORBA, which are generalized to a least common denominator, but makes use of Delphi's rich type system including Objects, Exceptions, Records, Sets and Enumerations.

DDObjects uses plain XML and HTTP as protocol, contains a broker component, a sourcecode generator as well as some new visual controls. DDObjects supports Delphi 5 to 7, 2005-XE2 (currently 32bit only) as well as C++ Builder 6, 2006 and 2009.
