= General Inter-ORB Protocol =

Protocol by which object request brokers communicate in CORBA

In distributed computing, General Inter-ORB Protocol (GIOP) is the message protocol by which object request brokers (ORBs) communicate in CORBA. Standards associated with the protocol are maintained by the Object Management Group (OMG). The current version of GIOP is 2.0.2. The GIOP architecture provides several concrete protocols, including:

- Internet InterORB Protocol (IIOP) — The Internet Inter-Orb Protocol is an implementation of the GIOP for use over the Internet, and provides a mapping between GIOP messages and the TCP/IP layer.
- SSL InterORB Protocol (SSLIOP) — SSLIOP is IIOP over SSL, providing encryption and authentication.
- HyperText InterORB Protocol (HTIOP) — HTIOP is IIOP over HTTP, providing transparent proxy bypassing.
- Zipped InterORB Protocol (ZIOP) — A zipped version of GIOP that reduces the bandwidth usage

== Environment Specific Inter-ORB Protocols ==
As an alternative to GIOP, CORBA includes the concept of an Environment Specific Inter-ORB Protocol (ESIOP). While GIOP is defined to meet general-purpose needs of most CORBA implementations, an ESIOP attempts to address special requirements. For example, an ESIOP might use an alternative protocol encoding to improve efficiency over networks with limited bandwidth or high latency. ESIOPs can also be used to layer CORBA on top of some non-CORBA technology stack, such as Distributed Computing Environment (DCE).

DCE Common Inter-ORB Protocol (DCE-CIOP) is an ESIOP for use in DCE. It maps CORBA to DCE RPC and CDR (Command Data Representation). DCE-CIOP is defined in chapter 16 of the CORBA 2.6.1 standard.

== Messages ==
The General Inter-ORB Protocol (GIOP) is the message protocol used by object request brokers (ORBs) to communicate in CORBA-based distributed computing systems. GIOP 2.0.2 is the current version of this protocol, and it provides a number of concrete protocols such as IIOP, SSLIOP, HTIOP, and ZIOP. IIOP is a mapping of GIOP messages to the TCP/IP layer for use over the Internet, while SSLIOP provides encryption and authentication. HTIOP, on the other hand, enables transparent proxy bypassing by using IIOP over HTTP. Finally, ZIOP is a compressed version of GIOP that minimizes bandwidth usage. In addition to these protocols, CORBA also includes the concept of an Environment Specific Inter-ORB Protocol (ESIOP) to address specific requirements. An ESIOP can use an alternative protocol encoding to improve efficiency over networks with limited bandwidth or high latency, or can be used to layer CORBA on top of non-CORBA technologies such as DCE. DCE Common Inter-ORB Protocol (DCE-CIOP) is an ESIOP that maps CORBA to DCE RPC and CDR.

== See also ==
- DIIOP
