= Interface segregation principle =

Principle in software engineering

In the field of software engineering, the interface segregation principle (ISP) states that no code should be forced to depend on methods it does not use. ISP splits interfaces that are very large into smaller and more specific ones so that clients will only have to know about the methods that are of interest to them. Such shrunken interfaces are also called role interfaces. ISP is intended to keep a system decoupled and thus easier to refactor, change, and redeploy. ISP is one of the five SOLID principles of object-oriented design, similar to the High Cohesion Principle of GRASP. Beyond object-oriented design, ISP is also a key principle in the design of distributed systems in general and one of the six IDEALS principles for microservice design.

== Importance in object-oriented design ==
Within object-oriented design, interfaces provide layers of abstraction that simplify code and create a barrier preventing coupling to dependencies. A system may become so coupled at multiple levels that it is no longer possible to make a change in one place without necessitating many additional changes. Using an interface or an abstract class can prevent this side effect.

== Origin ==
The ISP was first used and formulated by Robert C. Martin while consulting for Xerox. Xerox had created a new printer system that could perform a variety of tasks such as stapling and faxing. The software for this system was created from the ground up. As the software grew, making modifications became more and more difficult so that even the smallest change would take a redeployment cycle of an hour, which made development nearly impossible.

The design problem was that a single Job class was used by almost all of the tasks. Whenever a print job or a stapling job needed to be performed, a call was made to the Job class. This resulted in a 'fat' class with multitudes of methods specific to a variety of different clients. Because of this design, a staple job would know about all the methods of the print job, even though there was no use for them.

The solution suggested by Martin utilized what is today called the Interface Segregation Principle. Applied to the Xerox software, an interface layer between the Job class and its clients was added using the Dependency Inversion Principle. Instead of having one large Job class, a Staple Job interface or a Print Job interface was created that would be used by the Staple or Print classes, respectively, calling methods of the Job class. Therefore, one interface was created for each job type, which was all implemented by the Job class.

== Typical violation ==
A typical violation of the Interface Segregation Principle is given in Agile Software Development: Principles, Patterns, and Practices in 'ATM Transaction example' and in an article also written by Robert C. Martin specifically about the ISP. This example discusses the User Interface for an ATM, which handles all requests such as a deposit request, or a withdrawal request, and how this interface needs to be segregated into individual and more specific interfaces.

== See also ==
- SOLID – the "I" in SOLID stands for Interface segregation principle
