= Private browsing =

Privacy feature in most web browsers

The start page for private browsing mode in Firefox.

Private browsing (also known as incognito mode or private mode) is a feature in most web browsers that enhances user privacy. In this mode, the browser initiates a temporary session separate from its main session and user data. The browsing history is not recorded, and local data related to the session, like Cookies and Web cache, are deleted once the session ends. The primary purpose of these modes is to ensure that data and history from a specific browsing session do not remain on the device or get accessed by another user of the same device. In web development, it can be used to quickly test displaying pages as they appear to first-time visitors.

Private browsing modes do not necessarily protect users from being tracked by other websites or their Internet service provider (ISP). Furthermore, there is a possibility that identifiable traces of activity could be leaked from private browsing sessions by means of the operating system, security flaws in the browser, or via malicious browser extensions, and it has been found that certain HTML5 APIs can be used to detect the presence of private browsing modes due to differences in behavior.

== History ==
Apple's Safari browser was one of the first major web browsers to include this feature, first introduced in April 2005. The feature was subsequently adopted by other browsers, leading to the popularization of the term in 2008 by mainstream news outlets and computing websites during discussions about the beta versions of Internet Explorer 8. Adobe Flash Player 10.1 started respecting browser settings and private browsing modes in relation to storing local shared objects.

== Uses ==
Private browsing modes are commonly used for various purposes, such as concealing visits to sensitive websites (like adult-oriented content) from the browsing history, conducting unbiased web searches unaffected by previous browsing habits or recorded interests, offering a "clean" temporary session for guest users (for instance, on public computers), and managing multiple accounts on websites simultaneously. Private browsing can also be used to circumvent metered paywalls on some websites.

In a survey conducted by DuckDuckGo, 48% of participants chose not to respond, prompting lead researcher Elie Bursztein to observe, "Surveys are clearly not the best approach to understand why people use private browsing mode due to the embarrassment factor." Additionally, 18% of respondents indicated that their main use of private browsing modes was for online shopping.

A study by the Mozilla Foundation found that most sessions lasted only about 10 minutes. However, there were periods of increased activation, usually from 11 a.m. to 2 p.m., at 5 p.m., between 9 p.m. and 10 p.m., and a minor peak occurred about an hour or two after midnight.

== Support in popular browsers ==
Private browsing is known by different names in different browsers.

Date	Introduced with/included in	Synonym	Activation	
Date	Introduced with/included in	Synonym		macOS
29 April 2005	Safari 2.0	Private Browsing		⌘ Cmd+⇧ Shift+N
11 December 2008	Google Chrome	Incognito	Ctrl+⇧ Shift+N	⌘ Cmd+⇧ Shift+N
19 March 2009	Internet Explorer 8	InPrivate Browsing	Ctrl+⇧ Shift+P	⌘ Cmd+⇧ Shift+P
30 June 2009	Mozilla Firefox 3.5	Private Browsing	Ctrl+⇧ Shift+P	⌘ Cmd+⇧ Shift+P
2 March 2010	Opera 10.50	Private Tab / Private Window	Ctrl+⇧ Shift+N	⌘ Cmd+⇧ Shift+N
18 November 2014	Amazon Silk	Private Browsing	Swipe from the left edge of the screen, then tap Settings and select Enter Private Browsing	
29 July 2015	Microsoft Edge	InPrivate Browsing	Ctrl+⇧ Shift+N	⌘ Cmd+⇧ Shift+P
13 November 2019	Brave	Private Browsing	Ctrl+⇧ Shift+N	⌘ Cmd+⇧ Shift+N

Conversely, private browsing is sometimes deliberately turned off. Because the mode leaves no local record of a session, schools, workplaces and parents may treat it as an obstacle to supervision, and every major browser exposes an administrative setting for disabling it: Google Chrome's IncognitoModeAvailability policy, Microsoft Edge's InPrivateModeAvailability policy, and Mozilla Firefox's DisablePrivateBrowsing policy each remove the option from the browser's menus. Comparable controls exist on mobile platforms, where parental-control and device-management systems can hide the private tab option in Safari or Chrome on a supervised device. Disabling the feature does not itself prevent a user from clearing their history manually, and it removes the mode's incidental benefits, such as the ability to sign in to a second account or hand a device to a guest without exposing existing sessions.

== Security ==
It is a common misconception that private browsing modes can protect users from being tracked by other websites or their Internet service provider (ISP). Such entities can still use information such as IP addresses and user accounts to uniquely identify users. Private browsers on iOS, not created by Apple, must adhere to specific standards and regulations to be available on its platform for iPhone and iPad. Specifically, these browsers are required to employ the WebKit framework for rendering web pages. Consequently, third-party browsers cannot use their own rendering engines and must depend on Apple's framework instead. This constraint impacts the range of privacy features that these browsers can provide. This is one of the reasons why some browsers have partly addressed this shortcoming by offering additional privacy features that can be automatically enabled when using private browsing mode, such as Firefox's "Tracking Protection" feature to control use of web trackers (which has since been rolled into a larger "content blocking" function extended outside of private browsing mode), and Opera offering an in-house VPN service embedded within the browser.

Brazilian researchers published the results of a project in which they applied forensic techniques (namely the Foremost data carving tool and Strings program) to extract information about the user's browsing activities on Internet Explorer and Firefox browsers with their private mode enabled. They were able to collect enough data to identify pages visited and even to partially reconstruct them. This research was later extended to include the Chrome and Safari browsers. The gathered data proved that the browsers' private mode implementations cannot fully hide users' browsing activities and that browsers in private mode leave traces of activities in caching structures and files related to the paging process of the operating system.

Another independent security analysis, performed by a group of researchers at Newcastle University, reported a range of potential security vulnerabilities in the implementation of the private modes across Chrome, Firefox, Internet Explorer, and Safari, including that:

- Browser extensions could still record history if they were active in private mode. Although Chrome and Firefox have since required extensions to be enabled on an opt-in basis for their private browsing modes, an installed extension in the normal mode could learn the user's activities in the private mode by measuring the usage of shared computing resources.
- Data erasure by the browser alone is found to be insufficient. For example, the records of visited websites during the private session can be retained in memory for a long time even after the private session is closed. In addition, the visited website records are usually kept by the operating system in the local DNS cache. Furthermore, the modified timestamps of certain profile files saved on the disk may reveal if the private mode was previously turned on and when it was turned on.
- Software bugs present in some browsers were found to seriously degrade the security of the private mode. For example, in some earlier versions of Safari, the browser retained private browsing history records if the browser program was not closed normally (e.g., as a result of a crash), or if the user acted to add a bookmark within the private mode.
- Depending on whether the session is in the private or the normal mode, web browsers typically exhibit different user interfaces and traffic characteristics. This allows a remote website to tell if the user is currently in the private mode: for example, by checking the color of the hyperlinks or measuring the time of writing cookies.

Bugs and security vulnerabilities in extensions themselves may also leak personally identifiable data from private mode.

Implementations of the HTML5 FileSystem API can be used to detect users in private mode. In Google Chrome, the FileSystem API was not available in Incognito mode prior to version 76. To prevent circumvention of paywall policies and evasion of web tracking scripts used to monetize traffic, a number of websites — including The New York Times — have used such behavior to block access to users in private browsing mode, and requiring them to subscribe or log in. Chrome 76 allows the FileSystem API to be used in Incognito mode; explaining the change, Google argued that the ability to detect the use of Incognito mode infringes on users' privacy. However, it was later discovered that the disk space quotas for the API differed between normal and Incognito modes, providing another means by which to detect Incognito users. Despite statements otherwise by Google, this has not yet been patched. Scripts have also been developed to detect private browsing mode on other browsers, such as Firefox.

=== Associated lawsuit ===
In December 2023, Google settled a $5 billion consumer privacy lawsuit that alleged that its practices allowed it to track users in private browsing mode in various browsers.

== See also ==
- Dark web
- Internet privacy
- Web browser
