= CMVC =

CMVC may be:

- Castleford Male Voice Choir
- Configuration Management Version Control
