= Workmanship =

Skill at performing a task

Workmanship is a human attribute relating to knowledge and skill at performing a task. Workmanship is also a quality imparted to a product. The type of work may include the creation of handcrafts, art, writing, machinery and other products.

== Workmanship and craftsmanship ==
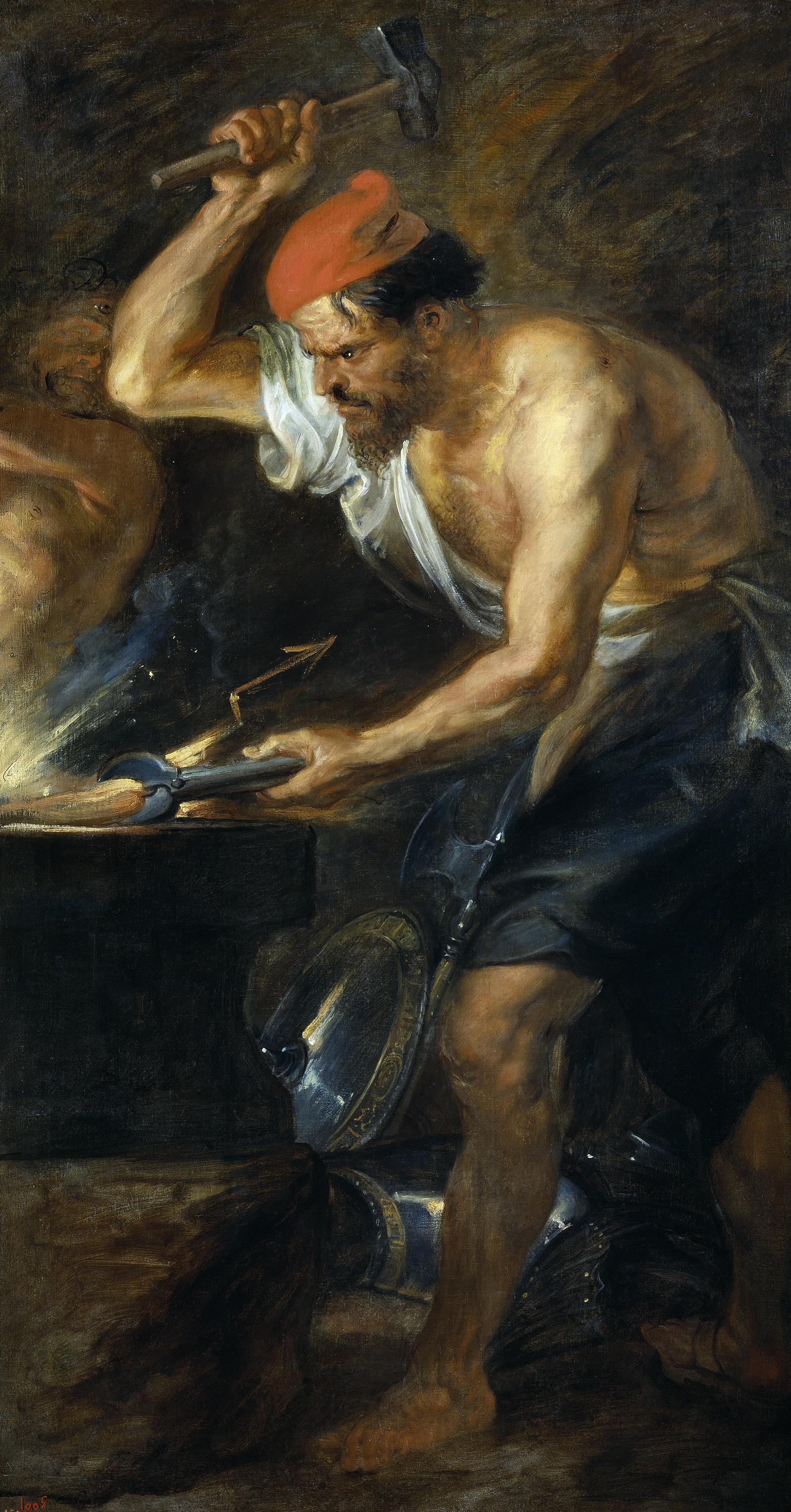
Rubens's 1536 rendition of Vulcan, the Roman counterpart of Hephaestus, the Greek God of Craftsmen.

Workmanship and craftsmanship are sometimes considered synonyms, but many draw a distinction between the two terms, or at least consider craftsmanship to mean "workmanship of the better sort". Among those who consider workmanship and craftsmanship to be different, the word "workmanlike" is sometimes even used as a pejorative, for example to suggest that while an author might understand the basics of their craft, they lack flair. David Pye wrote that no one can definitively state where workmanship ends and craftsmanship begins.

Sing clear-voiced Muse, of Hephaestus famed for skill. With bright-eyed Athena he taught men glorious crafts throughout the world—men who before used to dwell in caves in the mountains like wild beasts. But now that they have learned craftsmanship through Hephaestus famous for his art they live a peaceful life in own houses the whole year round.

— from a Homeric hymn celebrating craftsmanship

During the Middle Ages, smiths and especially armor smiths developed unique symbols of workmanship to distinguish the quality of their work. These are comparable to the mon family crests of Japan.

== Workmanship in society ==
Workmanship was likely a valued human attribute even in prehistoric times. In the opinion of the economist and sociologist Thorstein Veblen, the sense of workmanship is the single most important attribute governing the material well-being of a people, with the parental instinct coming a close second.

There have been periods in history when workmanship was looked down on; for example in Classical Greece and Ancient Rome, where it had become associated with slavery. This was not always the case—in the archaic period Greeks had valued workmanship, celebrating it in Homeric hymns. In the Western world, a return to a more positive attitude towards work emerged with the rise of Christianity. Veblen said the social value of workmanship in Europe reached its peak with the "Era of handicraft". The era began as workmanship flourished in response to the relative peace and security of property rights that Europe had achieved by the Late Middle Ages. The era ended as machine-driven processes began to displace the need for workmanship after the Industrial Revolution.

Workmanship was so central during the handicraft era, that, according to Veblen, even key theological questions were re-framed from "What has God ordained?" to "What has God wrought?". The high value placed on workmanship could sometimes be oppressive. For example, one explanation for the origin of the English phrase sent to Coventry is that it reflects the practice where London guild members who were expelled due to poor workmanship were forced to move to Coventry, which used to be a guild-free town. But workmanship was widely appreciated by common people. When workers accustomed to practicing high standards of workmanship were first recruited to work on production lines in factories, it was common for them to walk out, as the new roles were relatively monotonous, giving them little scope to use their skills. After Henry Ford introduced the first assembly line in 1913, he had to recruit about ten men to find one willing to stay in the job. Over time, and with Ford offering high rates of pay, aversion to the new ways of working was reduced.

Workmanship began to receive attention from scholars after its place in society came under threat by the rise of industrialization. The Arts and Crafts movement arose in the late 19th and early 20th century, as workmanship was being displaced by emphases on process, machine work, and the separation of design and planning skills from the execution of work. Founders of the movement like William Morris, John Ruskin and Charles Eliot Norton argued that the opportunity to engage in workmanship used to be a great source of fulfillment for the working class. The arts and crafts movement has since been interpreted as a palliative, which unintentionally reduced resistance to the displacement of workmanship.

In a book on the nature of workmanship, David Pye writes that the displacement of workmanship continued into the late 20th century. He writes that since World War II especially, there has been "an enormous intensification of interest in design" at the expense of workmanship. Industrial processes are increasingly designed to minimize the skill needed for workers to produce quality products. 21st century scholars such as Matthew Crawford argued that office and other white-collar work is now being displaced by similar technological developments to those that caused manual workers to be made redundant from the late 19th to early 20th century. For those jobs that remain, cognitive aspects of the jobs are taken away from workers as knowledge is centralized. Crawford calls for a revaluing of workmanship, saying that certain manual roles like mechanics, plumbers, and carpenters have been resistant to further automation, and are among the most likely to continue offering the worker the chance for independent thought. Writers like Alain de Botton and Jane McGonigal argued that the world of work needs to be reformed to make it more fulfilling and less stressful. In particular, workers need to be able to make a deeply felt, imaginative connection between their own efforts and the end product. McGonigal argues that computer games can be a source of ideas for doing this; she says the primary reason for World of Warcraft being so popular is the sense of "blissful productivity" that its players enjoy.

=== Electronics manufacturing ===
The reliability of electronic devices is greatly affected by the quality of the workmanship. Therefore, the electronics manufacturing industry has developed several voluntary consensus standards to provide guidance on how products should be designed, built, inspected, and tested.

== Workmanship and aversion to labor ==
Older economic writings hold that people are averse to labor and can only be motivated to work using incentives like rewards and punishments.

Christianity is generally approving of workmanship, though certain Bible passages such as Genesis 3:17 ("...Cursed is the ground because of you; through painful toil you will eat food from it all the days of your life.") contribute to the view that labor is a necessary evil, a punishment for original sin. (Though work did not originate with the fall of man, see Genesis 2:15—"Yahweh God took the man and put him in the garden of Eden to work it and keep it.")

Veblen is among those who now believe that work can be inherently joyful and satisfying. Veblen acknowledges that people tend towards idleness, but asserts that they also value work for its own sake, as is demonstrated by the vast amount of work that people do without obvious external pressure. Veblen also notes the near-universal tendency for people to approve of others' good work.

Psychologist Pernille Rasmussen believes that the tendency to value work can become so strong that it stops being a positive source of motivation, contributing instead to some people losing balance and becoming workaholics.

== See also ==
- Software craftsmanship
