= Php4delphi =

PHP4Delphi
- Designed by: Serhiy Perevoznyk
- Developer: Serhiy Perevoznyk
- First appeared: 2002; 24 years ago
- Stable release: 6.2 / November 24, 2017; 8 years ago
- Platform: IA-32, x86-64
- OS: Windows
- License: PHP
- Website: github.com/perevoznyk/php4delphi

Influenced by
- PHP, Delphi

PHP4Delphi is a visual development software framework for creating custom PHP extensions using Delphi. PHP extension, in the most basic terms, is a set of instructions that is designed to add functions to PHP.

== Overview ==
- PHP4Delphi provides a visual development framework for creating custom PHP extensions using Delphi. PHP extension, in the most basic of terms, is a set of instructions that is designed to add functions to PHP.
- PHP4Delphi also allows executing the PHP scripts within a Delphi program directly from file or memory. Global variables can be read, write, and result values set.
- PHP4Delphi allows embedding the PHP interpreter into a Delphi application to extend and customize the application without needing to recompile it.

== Structure ==
PHP4Delphi is organized into several subprojects:

=== PHP scripting ===
PHP4Delphi allows executing PHP scripts within a Delphi program using TpsvPHP component directly without a web server. It is a scripting for applications (like Visual Basic for Applications (VBA) for Microsoft Office) that enables writing client-side graphical user interface (GUI) applications or server-side PHP support in case if you are developing PHP enabled web servers. One of the goals behind it was to prove that PHP is a capable general-purpose scripting language that is suited for more than Web applications only. With PHP4Delphi you can use Delphi forms instead of web-forms, pass parameters to script directly.

=== PHP extensions development framework ===
The visual development framework gives the possibility to create custom PHP extensions using Delphi.

=== PHP4Applications ===
PHP4Applications allows integrating PHP in any application. It supports C#, C, C++, Visual Basic, Visual Basic for Applications (VBA), Delphi, Delphi .NET, Visual Basic (.NET), etc.
