= SOLID =

Object-oriented programming design principles

In object-oriented programming and functional programming, SOLID is a mnemonic acronym for five principles intended to make source code more understandable, flexible, and maintainable. Although the principles apply to object-oriented programming, they also form a core philosophy for methodologies such as agile software development and adaptive software development.

Software engineer and instructor Robert C. Martin introduced the basic principles of SOLID design in his 2000 paper Design Principles and Design Patterns about software rot. The SOLID acronym was coined around 2004 by Michael Feathers.

== Principles ==
=== Single responsibility principle ===
The single-responsibility principle (SRP) states that there should never be more than one reason for a class to change. In other words, every class should have only one responsibility.

Importance:

- Maintainability: When classes have a single, well-defined responsibility, they're easier to understand and modify.
- Testability: It's easier to write unit tests for classes with a single focus.
- Flexibility: Changes to one responsibility don't affect unrelated parts of the system.

=== Open–closed principle ===
The open–closed principle (OCP) states that software entities should be open for extension, but closed for modification.

Importance:

- Extensibility: New features can be added without modifying existing code.
- Stability: Reduces the risk of introducing bugs when making changes.
- Flexibility: Adapts to changing requirements more easily.

=== Liskov substitution principle ===
The Liskov substitution principle (LSP) states that functions that use pointers or references to base classes must be able to use pointers or references of derived classes without knowing it.

Importance:

- Polymorphism: Enables the use of polymorphic behavior, making code more flexible and reusable.
- Reliability: Ensures that subclasses adhere to the contract defined by the superclass.
- Predictability: Guarantees that replacing a superclass object with a subclass object won't break the program.

=== Interface segregation principle ===
The interface segregation principle (ISP) states that clients should not be forced to depend upon interface methods that they do not use.

Importance:

- Decoupling: Reduces dependencies between classes, making the code more modular and maintainable.
- Flexibility: Allows for more targeted implementations of interfaces.
- Avoids unnecessary dependencies: Clients don't have to depend on methods they don't use.

=== Dependency inversion principle ===
The dependency inversion principle (DIP) states that one should depend upon abstractions, not concretes.

Importance:

- Loose coupling: Reduces dependencies between modules, making the code more flexible and easier to test.
- Flexibility: Enables changes to implementations without affecting clients.
- Maintainability: Makes code easier to understand and modify.

== See also ==
- Code reuse
- GRASP (object-oriented design)
- Inheritance (object-oriented programming)
- List of software development philosophies
