= Craig Larman =

Canadian-born computer scientist, author, and organizational development consultant

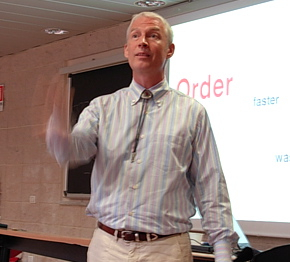
- Born: 1958 (age 67–68)
- Education: Simon Fraser University
- Occupation: Computer Scientist
- Years active: 1985-present

Craig Larman (born 1958) is a Canadian computer scientist, author, and organizational development consultant. With Bas Vodde, he is best known for formulating LeSS (Large-Scale Scrum), and for several books on product and software development.

== Education and career ==
Larman received a B.Sc. and a M.Sc. in computer science from Simon Fraser University in Vancouver, British Columbia, focusing on artificial intelligence and object-oriented programming languages.

Starting in the late 1970s, Larman worked as a software developer in APL, Lisp, Prolog, and Smalltalk, using iterative and evolutionary methods, which strongly influenced his interest in methods and technologies in software development, that later became a focus of his consulting and writing.

In the 1990s, he was a volunteer organizer at the OOPSLA conferences, which exposed him to early introductions to the Agile software development methods Scrum and Extreme Programming presented at the conference, which led to his interest and work in those areas.

Starting in the late 1990s, he served as chief scientist at Valtech, a global consulting and outsourcing company based in Paris, France, with an outsourcing division in Bengaluru, India. While in Bengaluru, Larman worked on the development of scaling Agile development to outsourcing, formulated as part of Large-Scale Scrum.

In 2005 while consulting at Nokia Networks in Helsinki on the introduction of Scrum and other Agile methods for large-scale development, he met Bas Vodde, who worked within the company with the same remit. This led to their collaboration culminating in formulating and writing about LeSS (Large-Scale Scrum).

== Contributions ==
In 1997, Larman authored Applying UML and Patterns: An Introduction to Object-Oriented Analysis & Design, a very popular textbook that contributed to the subsequent widespread adoption of object-oriented development. In this he introduced the GRASP principles of object-oriented design, contributing to the codification of software design principles.

In 2005 Larman was the co-creator of LeSS (Large-Scale Scrum), contributing to the application of Agile software development to large-scale product development. In 2017 the Scrum Alliance—a global non-profit educational certification body for Scrum and Agile software development subjects -- adopted LeSS for scaling development, citing its contribution.

In 2025, Craig Larman co-authored an edition of Primer for Org Topologies.

== Implications of AI on HR and Org Design ==
Since 2022, Craig started to amplify the message that "Any management approach that doesn’t include AI as a central part of the future workforce is of the past".

Since then, Craig would repeat this message at each annual LeSS Conference and other public appearances, demonstrating the raising and accelerating power of GPT in software design and coding activities. He would stress that the implications on org design (skill acquisition) by the modern workforce are revolutionary, and a fall of a single-skilled worker is on the horizon.

In 2025, he put those ideas into writing as a part of the Org Topologies Primer and related articles. See "Elevating with AI" and A talk "AI HR & Organizational Design"

== Selected publications ==
=== Books ===
- 1997 - Applying UML and Patterns - ISBN 0-13-748880-7
- 1999 - Java 2 Performance and Idiom Guide - ISBN 0-13-014260-3 (with Rhett Guthrie)
- 2001 - Applying UML and Patterns: An Introduction to Object-Oriented Analysis and Design and the Unified Process - ISBN 0-13-092569-1
- 2003 - Agile and Iterative Development: A Manager's Guide - ISBN 0-13-111155-8
- 2004 - Applying UML and Patterns: An Introduction to Object-Oriented Analysis and Design and Iterative Development - ISBN 0-13-148906-2
- 2008 - Scaling Lean & Agile Development: Thinking and Organizational Tools for Large-Scale Scrum - ISBN 0-321-48096-1 (with Bas Vodde)
- 2010 - Practices for Scaling Lean & Agile Development: Large, Multisite, and Offshore Product Development with Large-Scale Scrum - ISBN 0-321-63640-6 (with Bas Vodde)
- 2016 - Large-Scale Scrum: More with LeSS - ISBN 9332585350 (with Bas Vodde)
- 2026 - 10X ORG — Powered by Org Topologies: A Manager’s Guide to Elevating Business Performance with People and AI - ISBN 9083670406 (with Alexey Krivitsky and Roland Flemm)

=== Articles ===
- Larman, Craig. "Protected variation: The importance of being closed." IEEE Software 18.3 (2001): 89–91.
