= Service locator pattern =

Design pattern for encapsulating service obtaining

UML class diagram of the service locator pattern.

The service locator pattern is a design pattern used in software development to encapsulate the processes involved in obtaining a service with a strong abstraction layer. This pattern uses a central registry known as the "service locator", which on request returns the information necessary to perform a certain task. Proponents of the pattern say the approach simplifies component-based applications where all dependencies are cleanly listed at the beginning of the whole application design, consequently making traditional dependency injection a more complex way of connecting objects. Critics of the pattern argue that it is an anti-pattern which obscures dependencies and makes software harder to test.

== Advantages ==
- The "service locator" can act as a simple run-time linker. This allows code to be added at run-time without re-compiling the application, and in some cases without having to even restart it.
- Applications can optimize themselves at run-time by selectively adding and removing items from the service locator. For example, an application can detect that it has a better library for reading JPG images available than the default one, and alter the registry accordingly.
- Large sections of a library or application can be completely separated. The only link between them becomes the registry.
- An application may use multiple structured service locators purposed for particular functionality/testing. Service locator does not mandate one single static class per process.
- The solution may be simpler with service locator (vs. dependency injection) in applications with well-structured component/service design. In these cases, the disadvantages may actually be considered as an advantage (e.g., no need to supply various dependencies to every class and maintain dependency configurations).
- Service location process can be made sensitive to a calling scope/context which can represent a specific business case. Instead of relying on a fixed DI which typically supplies an object with its dependencies via a constructor parameter passing, the service location call can be made in a business context as needed. For example, one may wish to invoke a IShippingStrategy instance obtained via a service location call, supplying a ShippingContext as a parameter to service locator stating what is being shipped from where and where to, so service locator can match the best case (e.g. using a pattern match score). This significantly simplifies complex business application architecture (e.g. medical scoring systems, routing) where circuitous decision making can be done via scoring of the best matching strategy located dynamically at a runtime

== Disadvantages ==
- The registry hides the class' dependencies, causing run-time errors instead of compile-time errors when dependencies are missing (unlike when using constructor injection).
- The registry makes code harder to test, since all tests need to interact with the same global service locator class to set the fake dependencies of a class under test.

== Example ==
Consider a simple logging framework:

interface Logger {
    void log(String message);
}

class ConsoleLogger implements Logger {
    public void log(String message) {
        System.out.println("LOG: " + message);
    }
}

A service locator for such a system would be the following:

class LoggerServiceLocator {
    private static Logger logger = new ConsoleLogger();

    // Obtain the logger
    public static Logger getLogger() {
        return logger;
    }

    // Allow replacing a logger
    public static void registerLogger(Logger replacement) {
        logger = replacement;
    }
}

This allows the client application to not have to instantiate the logger directly, but rather obtain it through the provider:

Logger logger = LoggerServiceLocator.getLogger();
logger.log("Obtained logger from LoggerServiceLocator.");

== See also ==
- Dependency injection
- Dependency inversion principle
- Java Naming and Directory Interface
