= Software craftsmanship =

Software development approach

Software craftsmanship is an approach to software development that emphasizes the coding skills of the software developers. It is a response by software developers to the perceived ills of the mainstream software industry, including the prioritization of financial concerns over developer accountability.

Historically, programmers have been encouraged to see themselves as practitioners of the well-defined statistical analysis and mathematical rigor of a scientific approach with computational theory. This has changed to an engineering approach with connotations of precision, predictability, measurement, risk mitigation, and professionalism. Practice of engineering led to calls for licensing, certification and codified bodies of knowledge as mechanisms for spreading engineering knowledge and maturing the field.

The Agile Manifesto, with its emphasis on "individuals and interactions over processes and tools" questioned some of these assumptions. The Software Craftsmanship Manifesto extends and challenges further the assumptions of the Agile Manifesto, drawing a metaphor between modern software development and the apprenticeship model of medieval Europe.

== Overview ==
The Pragmatic Programmer by Andy Hunt and Dave Thomas and Software Craftsmanship by Pete McBreen explicitly position software development as heir to the guild traditions of medieval Europe. The philosopher Richard Sennett wrote about software as a modern craft in his book The Craftsman. Freeman Dyson, in his essay "Science as a Craft Industry", expands software crafts to include mastery of using software as a driver for economic benefit:

"In spite of the rise of Microsoft and other giant producers, software remains in large part a craft industry. Because of the enormous variety of specialized applications, there will always be room for individuals to write software based on their unique knowledge. There will always be niche markets to keep small software companies alive. The craft of writing software will not become obsolete. And the craft of using software creatively is flourishing even more than the craft of writing it."

Following initial discussion, conferences were held in both London and Chicago, after which a manifesto was drafted and put online to gather signatories. This was followed by the development of practices to further develop the movement including the exchange of talent in "Craftsman Swaps" and the assessment of skills in "Craftsmanship Spikes".

== Manifesto ==
From the Software Craftsmanship website:

As aspiring Software Craftsmen we are raising the bar of professional software development by practicing it and helping others learn the craft. Through this work we have come to value:

- Not only working software, but also well-crafted software
- Not only responding to change, but also steadily adding value
- Not only individuals and interactions, but also a community of professionals
- Not only customer collaboration, but also productive partnerships

That is, in pursuit of the items on the left we have found the items on the right to be indispensable.

© 2009, the undersigned.

This statement may be freely copied in any form, but only in its entirety through this notice.

== History ==
The origins of software craftsmanship came from the agile software development movement, which aimed to reform software project management in the 1990s.

In 1992, Jack W. Reeves' essay "What Is Software Design?" suggested that software development is both a craft and an engineering discipline. Seven years later, in 1999, The Pragmatic Programmer was published. Its sub-title, "From Journeyman to Master", suggested that programmers go through stages in their professional development akin to the medieval guild traditions of Europe.

In 2001, Pete McBreen's book Software Craftsmanship was published. It suggested that software developers need not see themselves as part of the engineering tradition and that a different metaphor would be more suitable.

In his August keynote at Agile 2008, Robert C. Martin proposed a fifth value for the Agile Manifesto, namely "Craftsmanship over Crap". He later changed his proposal to "Craftsmanship over Execution".

In December 2008, a number of aspiring software craftsmen met in Libertyville, Illinois, with the intent of establishing a set of principles for software craftsmanship. Three months later, a summary of the general conclusions was decided upon. It was presented publicly, for both viewing and signing, in the form of a Manifesto for Software Craftsmanship.

In April 2009, two of the companies in the software craftsmanship movement, 8th Light and Obtiva, experimented with a "Craftsman Swap." The Chicago Tribune covered this event on 15 June 2009. In January 2010, a second Craftsman Swap was held between Obtiva and Relevance.

The London Software Craftsmanship Community (LSCC), founded in 2010 by Sandro Mancuso and Mashooq Badar, is one of the largest software craftsmanship communities in the world, with more than 6,500 members. In 2013, Mancuso and Badar founded Codurance, a software consultancy based on software craftsmanship principles. In 2014, Mancuso published The Software Craftsman: Professionalism, Pragmatism, Pride, with a foreword by Robert C. Martin. . It brought the software craftsmanship movement additional visibility, reinforcing the efforts to achieve higher technical excellence and customer satisfaction.
