= Software environment =

Software environment may refer to:

- Run-time system
- Audio synthesis environment
