= David Musser =

Professor emeritus of computer science

Dave Musser
- Born: David Musser
- Education: University of Wisconsin at Madison
- Occupation: Computer scientist
- Years active: 1970s-
- Known for: Invention of introsort and introselect

David "Dave" Musser is a professor emeritus of computer science at the Rensselaer Polytechnic Institute in Troy, New York, United States.

He is known for his work in generic programming, particularly as applied to C++, and his collaboration with Alexander Stepanov. Their work together includes coining the term "generic programming" in Musser & Stepanov (1989), and led to the creation of the C++ Standard Template Library (STL).

In Musser (1997), he developed the sorting algorithm called introsort (also known as introspective sort), and the related selection algorithm called introselect, to provide algorithms that are both efficient and have optimal worst-case performance, for use in the STL.

== Early life and career ==
He has a doctorate from the University of Wisconsin at Madison. Early in his career, he was on the computer science faculty at the University of Texas at Austin. He was also involved in DARPA-sponsored research at the Information Sciences Institute in California. In 1979, he started eight years at GE's Labs in Niskayuna, New York on the research staff. In 1988, he joined the computer science department at Rensselaer full time. He was tenured in 1995. In 2007 he retired from Rensselaer.

In 2013, he was involved in the ACM Workshop on Programming Based on Actors, Agents, and Decentralized Control, contributing the paper "Structured reasoning about actor systems" along with Carlos A. Varela. The paper was also presented in 2013 at the Agere! 13, Splash Conference in Indianapolis.

In 2017, MIT Press published the book Fundamental Proof Methods in Computer Science by Musser and Konstantine Arkoudas.

== Selected publications ==
- Musser, D. R.; Stepanov, A. A. (1989). "Generic programming". In P. Gianni (ed.). Symbolic and Algebraic Computation: International symposium ISSAC 1988. Lecture Notes in Computer Science. Vol. 358. pp. 13–25. doi:10.1007/3-540-51084-2_2. ISBN 978-3-540-51084-0.
- Musser, David R. (1997). "Introspective Sorting and Selection Algorithms". Software: Practice and Experience. 27 (8): 983–993. doi:10.1002/(SICI)1097-024X(199708)27:8<983::AID-SPE117>3.0.CO;2-#.

== See also ==
- List of programming language researchers
