= Alexander Stepanov =

Russian-American computer programmer (born 1950)

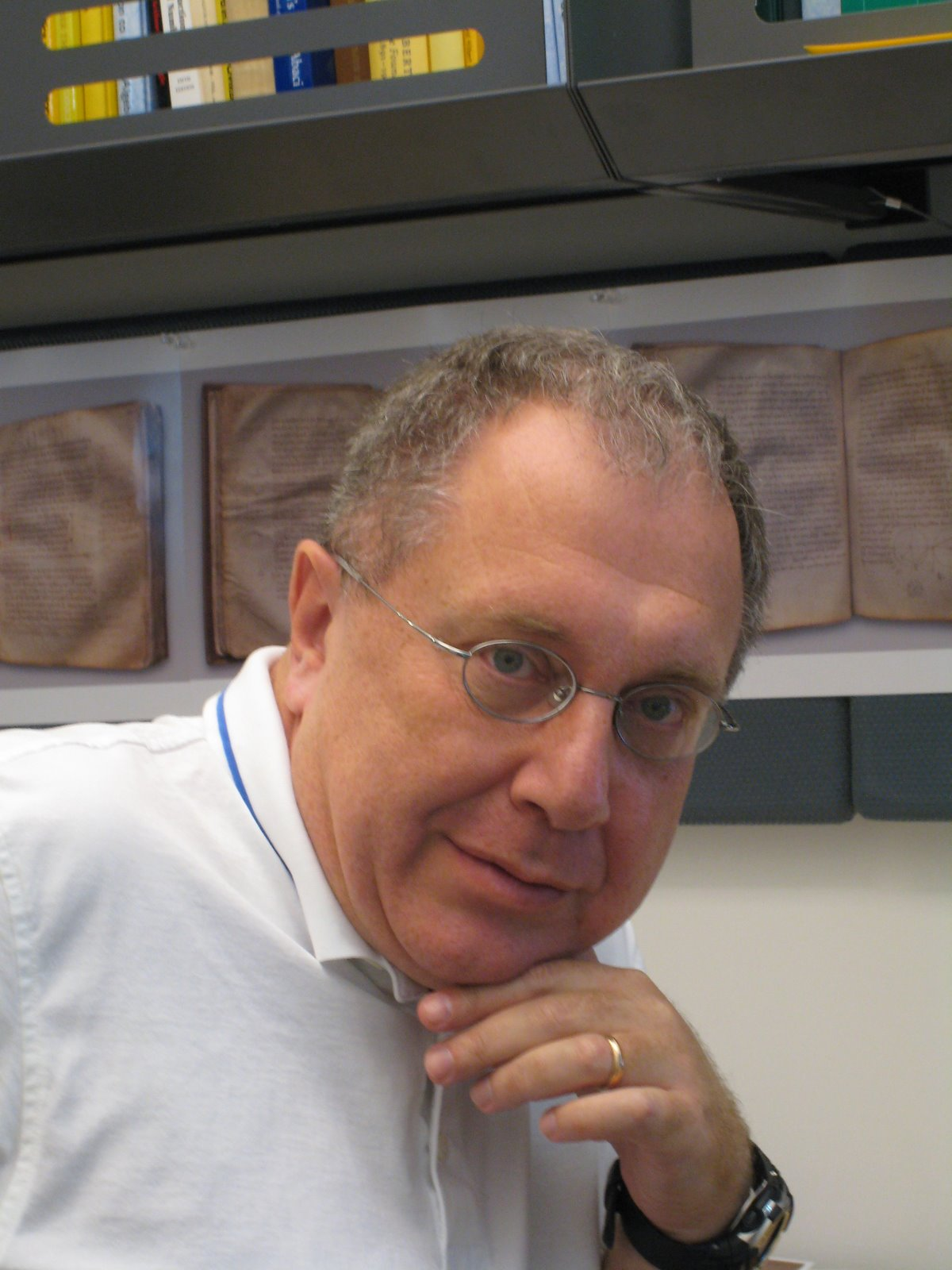
Alexander Stepanov

Alexander Alexandrovich Stepanov (Russian: Алекса́ндр Алекса́ндрович Степа́нов; born November 16, 1950, Moscow) is a Russian-American computer programmer, best known as an advocate of generic programming and as the primary designer and implementer of the C++ Standard Template Library, which he started to develop around 1992 while employed at HP Labs. He had earlier been working for Bell Labs close to Andrew Koenig and tried to convince Bjarne Stroustrup to introduce something like Ada generics in C++. He is credited with the notion of concept.

He is the author (with Paul McJones) of Elements of Programming, a book that grew out of a "Foundations of Programming" course that Stepanov taught at Adobe Systems (while employed there). He is also the author (with Daniel E. Rose) of From Mathematics to Generic Programming.

He retired in January 2016 from A9.com.

== Standard Template Library and generic programming ==
Alexander Stepanov is an advocate of generic programming. Although David Musser had already developed and advocated some aspects of generic programming by 1971, it was limited to a rather specialized area of software development (computer algebra).

Stepanov recognized the full potential for generic programming and persuaded his then-colleagues at General Electric Research and Development (including, primarily, David Musser and Deepak Kapur) that generic programming should be pursued as a comprehensive basis for software development. At the time there was no real support in any programming language for generic programming.

The first major language to provide such support was Ada, with its generic units feature. By 1987 Stepanov and Musser had developed and published an Ada library for list processing that embodied the results of much of their research on generic programming. However, Ada had not achieved much acceptance outside the defense industry and C++ seemed more likely to become widely used and provide good support for generic programming even though the language was relatively immature. Another reason for turning to C++, which Stepanov recognized early on, was that the C/C++ model of computation (which allows very flexible access to storage via pointers) is crucial to achieving generality without losing efficiency. It eventually led to the development of the Standard Template Library of C++.

== See also ==
- Object-oriented programming criticism
- List of pioneers in computer science
