= Trellis-Owl =

Defunct programming language

Trellis/Owl, or simply Owl, (Note: The editor for a later collection of papers introduces the language stating "The base language is Trellis (originally called Trellis/Owl, hence DOWL where the D stands for Distributed)..." This appears to be a typo or confusion on the part of the author. "DOWL" is short for "distributed Owl", not "distributed Trellis", and all DEC documentation states Trellis is the development environment.) is a defunct object-oriented programming language created by Digital Equipment Corporation. It was part of a programming environment, Trellis. It ran on the OpenVMS operating system.

Trellis/Owl differed from contemporary languages in several ways. For one, it did not use dot notation for method calls on objects, and used a traditional functional style instead, which they referred to as operations. Operations were supported by the concept of a controlling object, the first parameter in the function call, which indicated which class was being referred to. Whereas most OO languages of the era might have a myStringVariableToPrint.print() method, in Trellis/Owl this would be print(myStringVariableToPrint), and the print method of the class String would be called based on a string being the first parameter. Trellis/Owl also supported properties, which they referred to as components. Trellis/Owl also included a system allowing the easy creation of iterators, using the yields keyword to replace returns in the definition of an operation. yields indicates the operator will return a series of values instead of one.
