= Generic programming =

Style of computer programming

Generic programming is a style of computer programming in which algorithms are written in terms of data types to-be-specified-later that are then instantiated when needed for specific types provided as parameters. This approach, pioneered in the programming language ML in 1973, permits writing common functions or data types that differ only in the set of types on which they operate when used, thus reducing duplicate code.

Generic programming was introduced to the mainstream with Ada in 1977. With templates in C++, generic programming became part of the repertoire of professional library design. The techniques were further improved and parameterized types were introduced in the influential 1994 book Design Patterns.

New techniques were introduced by Andrei Alexandrescu in his 2001 book Modern C++ Design: Generic Programming and Design Patterns Applied. Subsequently, D implemented the same ideas.

Such software entities are known as generics in Ada, C#, Dart, Delphi, Eiffel, F#, Java, Mojo, Nim, Python, Go, Rust, Swift, TypeScript, and Visual Basic (.NET). They are known as parametric polymorphism in ML, Scala, Julia, and Haskell. (Haskell terminology also uses the term generic for a related but somewhat different concept.)

The term generic programming was originally coined by David Musser and Alexander Stepanov in a more specific sense than the above, to describe a programming paradigm in which fundamental requirements on data types are abstracted from across concrete examples of algorithms and data structures and formalized as concepts, with generic functions implemented in terms of these concepts, typically using language genericity mechanisms as described above.

== Stepanov–Musser and other generic programming paradigms ==
Generic programming is defined in Musser & Stepanov (1989) as follows,

Generic programming centers around the idea of abstracting from concrete, efficient algorithms to obtain generic algorithms that can be combined with different data representations to produce a wide variety of useful software.

— Musser, David R.; Stepanov, Alexander A., Generic Programming

The "generic programming" paradigm is an approach to software decomposition whereby fundamental requirements on types are abstracted from across concrete examples of algorithms and data structures and formalized as concepts, analogously to the abstraction of algebraic theories in abstract algebra. Early examples of this programming approach were implemented in Scheme and Ada, although the best known example is the Standard Template Library (STL), which developed a theory of iterators that is used to decouple sequence data structures and the algorithms operating on them.

For example, given N sequence data structures, e.g. singly linked list, vector etc., and M algorithms to operate on them, e.g. find, sort etc., a direct approach would implement each algorithm specifically for each data structure, giving N × M combinations to implement. However, in the generic programming approach, each data structure returns a model of an iterator concept (a simple value type that can be dereferenced to retrieve the current value, or changed to point to another value in the sequence) and each algorithm is instead written generically with arguments of such iterators, e.g. a pair of iterators pointing to the beginning and end of the subsequence or range to process. Thus, only N + M data structure-algorithm combinations need be implemented. Several iterator concepts are specified in the STL, each a refinement of more restrictive concepts e.g. forward iterators only provide movement to the next value in a sequence (e.g. suitable for a singly linked list or a stream of input data), whereas a random-access iterator also provides direct constant-time access to any element of the sequence (e.g. suitable for a vector). An important point is that a data structure will return a model of the most general concept that can be implemented efficiently—computational complexity requirements are explicitly part of the concept definition. This limits the data structures a given algorithm can be applied to and such complexity requirements are a major determinant of data structure choice. Generic programming similarly has been applied in other domains, e.g. graph algorithms.

Although this approach often uses language features of compile-time genericity and templates, it is independent of particular language-technical details. Generic programming pioneer Alexander Stepanov wrote,

Generic programming is about abstracting and classifying algorithms and data structures. It gets its inspiration from Knuth and not from type theory. Its goal is the incremental construction of systematic catalogs of useful, efficient and abstract algorithms and data structures. Such an undertaking is still a dream.

— Alexander Stepanov, Short History of STL

I believe that iterator theories are as central to Computer Science as theories of rings or Banach spaces are central to Mathematics.

— Alexander Stepanov, An Interview with A. Stepanov

Bjarne Stroustrup noted,

Following Stepanov, we can define generic programming without mentioning language features: Lift algorithms and data structures from concrete examples to their most general and abstract form.

— Bjarne Stroustrup, Evolving a language in and for the real world: C++ 1991-2006

Other programming paradigms that have been described as generic programming include Datatype generic programming as described in "Generic Programming – an Introduction". The Scrap your boilerplate approach is a lightweight generic programming approach for Haskell.

In this article we distinguish the high-level programming paradigms of generic programming, above, from the lower-level programming language genericity mechanisms used to implement them (see Programming language support for genericity). For further discussion and comparison of generic programming paradigms, see.

== Programming language support for genericity ==
Genericity facilities have existed in high-level languages since at least the 1970s in languages such as ML, CLU and Ada, and were subsequently adopted by many object-based and object-oriented languages, including BETA, C++, D, Eiffel, Java, and DEC's now defunct Trellis-Owl.

Genericity is implemented and supported differently in various programming languages; the term "generic" has also been used differently in various programming contexts. For example, in Forth the compiler can execute code while compiling and one can create new compiler keywords and new implementations for those words on the fly. It has few words that expose the compiler behaviour and therefore naturally offers genericity capacities that, however, are not referred to as such in most Forth texts. Similarly, dynamically typed languages, especially interpreted ones, usually offer genericity by default as both passing values to functions and value assignment are type-indifferent and such behavior is often used for abstraction or code terseness, however this is not typically labeled genericity as it's a direct consequence of the dynamic typing system employed by the language. The term has been used in functional programming, specifically in Haskell-like languages, which use a structural type system where types are always parametric and the actual code on those types is generic. These uses still serve a similar purpose of code-saving and rendering an abstraction.

Arrays and structs can be viewed as predefined generic types. Every usage of an array or struct type instantiates a new concrete type, or reuses a previous instantiated type. Array element types and struct element types are parameterized types, which are used to instantiate the corresponding generic type. All this is usually built-in in the compiler and the syntax differs from other generic constructs. Some extensible programming languages try to unify built-in and user defined generic types.

A broad survey of genericity mechanisms in programming languages follows. For a specific survey comparing suitability of mechanisms for generic programming, see.

=== In object-oriented languages ===
When creating container classes in statically typed languages, it is inconvenient to write specific implementations for each datatype contained, especially if the code for each datatype is virtually identical. For example, in C++, this duplication of code can be circumvented by defining a class template:

class Animal {
    // ...
};

class Car {
    // ...
};

template <typename T>
class MyList {
    // Class contents.
};

MyList<Animal> animalList;
MyList<Car> carList;

Above, T is a placeholder for whatever type is specified when the list is created. These "generic objects of type T", commonly called templates, allow a class to be reused with different datatypes as long as certain contracts such as subtypes and signature are kept. This genericity mechanism should not be confused with inclusion polymorphism, which is the algorithmic usage of exchangeable sub-classes: for instance, a list of objects of type MovingEntity containing objects of type Animal and Car. Templates can also be used for type-independent functions as in the swapping example below:

import std;

using std::string;

// A similar, but safer and potentially faster function 
// is defined in the standard library header <utility>
template <typename T>
void swap(T& a, T& b) noexcept {
    T temp = b;
    b = a;
    a = temp;
}

int main(int argc, char* argv[]) {
    string world = "World!";
    string hello = "Hello,";
    swap(world, hello);
    std::println("{} {}", world, hello);  // Output is "Hello, World!".
}

The C++ template construct used above is widely cited as the genericity construct that popularized the notion among programmers and language designers and supports many generic programming idioms. The D language also offers fully generic-capable templates based on the C++ precedent but with a simplified syntax. The Java language has provided genericity facilities syntactically based on C++'s since the introduction of Java Platform, Standard Edition (J2SE) 5.0.

C# 2.0, Oxygene 1.5 (formerly Chrome) and Visual Basic (.NET) 2005 have constructs that exploit the support for generics present in Microsoft .NET Framework since version 2.0.

==== Ada ====
Ada has had generics since it was first designed in 1977–1980. The standard library uses generics to provide many services. Ada 2005 adds a comprehensive generic container library to the standard library, which was inspired by C++'s Standard Template Library.

A generic unit is a package or a subprogram that takes one or more generic formal parameters.

A generic formal parameter is a value, a variable, a constant, a type, a subprogram, or even an instance of another, designated, generic unit. For generic formal types, the syntax distinguishes between discrete, floating-point, fixed-point, access (pointer) types, etc. Some formal parameters can have default values.

To instantiate a generic unit, the programmer passes actual parameters for each formal. The generic instance then behaves just like any other unit. It is possible to instantiate generic units at run-time, for example, inside a loop.

===== Example =====
The specification of a generic package:

 generic
    Max_Size : Natural; -- a generic formal value
    type Element_Type is private; -- a generic formal type; accepts any nonlimited type
 package Stacks is
    type Size_Type is range 0 .. Max_Size;
    type Stack is limited private;
    procedure Create (S : out Stack;
                      Initial_Size : in Size_Type := Max_Size);
    procedure Push (Into : in out Stack; Element : in Element_Type);
    procedure Pop (From : in out Stack; Element : out Element_Type);
    Overflow : exception;
    Underflow : exception;
 private
    subtype Index_Type is Size_Type range 1 .. Max_Size;
    type Vector is array (Index_Type range <>) of Element_Type;
    type Stack (Allocated_Size : Size_Type := 0) is record
       Top : Index_Type;
       Storage : Vector (1 .. Allocated_Size);
    end record;
 end Stacks;

Instantiating the generic package:

 type Bookmark_Type is new Natural;
 -- records a location in the text document we are editing

 package Bookmark_Stacks is new Stacks (Max_Size => 20,
                                        Element_Type => Bookmark_Type);
 -- Allows the user to jump between recorded locations in a document

Using an instance of a generic package:

 type Document_Type is record
    Contents : Ada.Strings.Unbounded.Unbounded_String;
    Bookmarks : Bookmark_Stacks.Stack;
 end record;

 procedure Edit (Document_Name : in String) is
   Document : Document_Type;
 begin
   -- Initialise the stack of bookmarks:
   Bookmark_Stacks.Create (S => Document.Bookmarks, Initial_Size => 10);
   -- Now, open the file Document_Name and read it in...
 end Edit;

===== Advantages and limits =====
The language syntax allows precise specification of constraints on generic formal parameters. For example, it is possible to specify that a generic formal type will only accept a modular type as the actual. It is also possible to express constraints between generic formal parameters; for example:

 generic
    type Index_Type is (<>); -- must be a discrete type
    type Element_Type is private; -- can be any nonlimited type
    type Array_Type is array (Index_Type range <>) of Element_Type;

In this example, Array_Type is constrained by both Index_Type and Element_Type. When instantiating the unit, the programmer must pass an actual array type that satisfies these constraints.

The disadvantage of this fine-grained control is a complicated syntax, but, because all generic formal parameters are completely defined in the specification, the compiler can instantiate generics without looking at the body of the generic.

Unlike C++, Ada does not allow specialised generic instances, and requires that all generics be instantiated explicitly. These rules have several consequences:

- the compiler can implement shared generics: the object code for a generic unit can be shared between all instances (unless the programmer requests inlining of subprograms, of course). As further consequences:
  - there is no possibility of code bloat (code bloat is common in C++ and requires special care, as explained below).
  - it is possible to instantiate generics at run-time, and at compile time, since no new object code is required for a new instance.
  - actual objects corresponding to a generic formal object are always considered to be non-static inside the generic; see Generic formal objects in the Wikibook for details and consequences.
- all instances of a generic being exactly the same, it is easier to review and understand programs written by others; there are no "special cases" to take into account.
- all instantiations being explicit, there are no hidden instantiations that might make it difficult to understand the program.
- Ada does not permit arbitrary computation at compile time, because operations on generic arguments are performed at runtime.

==== C++ ====
C++ uses templates to enable generic programming techniques. The C++ Standard Library includes the Standard Template Library or STL that provides a framework of templates for common data structures and algorithms. Templates in C++ may also be used for template metaprogramming, which is a way of pre-evaluating some of the code at compile-time rather than run-time. Using template specialization, C++ Templates are Turing complete.

===== Technical overview =====
There are many kinds of templates, the most common being function templates and class templates. A function template is a pattern for creating ordinary functions based upon the parameterizing types supplied when instantiated. For example, the C++ Standard Template Library contains the function template std::max(x, y) that creates functions that return either x or y, whichever is larger. max() could be defined like this:

template <typename T>
[[nodiscard]]
constexpr T max(T x, T y) noexcept {
    return x < y ? y : x;
}

Specializations of this function template, instantiations with specific types, can be called just like an ordinary function:

std::println("{}", max(3, 7)); // Outputs 7.

The compiler examines the arguments used to call max and determines that this is a call to max(int, int). It then instantiates a version of the function where the type variable T is int, making the equivalent of the following function:

[[nodiscard]]
constexpr int max(int x, int y) noexcept {
    return x < y ? y : x;
}

This works whether the arguments x and y are integers, strings, or any other type for which the expression x < y is sensible, or more specifically, for any type for which operator< is defined. Common inheritance is not needed for the set of types that can be used, and so it is very similar to duck typing. A program defining a custom data type can use operator overloading to define the meaning of < for that type, thus allowing its use with the std::max() function template. While this may seem a minor benefit in this isolated example, in the context of a comprehensive library like the STL it allows the programmer to get extensive functionality for a new data type, just by defining a few operators for it. Merely defining < allows a type to be used with the standard std::sort(), std::stable_sort(), and std::binary_search() algorithms or to be put inside data structures such as std::set<T>s (equivalent to java.util.TreeSet<T>), heaps, and associative arrays.

C++ templates are completely type safe at compile time. As a demonstration, the standard type std::complex<T> does not define the < operator, because there is no strict order on complex numbers. Therefore, std::max(x, y) will fail with a compile error, if x and y are complex values. Likewise, other templates that rely on < cannot be applied to complex data unless a comparison (in the form of a functor or function) is provided. For instance, std::complex<T> cannot be used as key for a std::map<K, V> (equivalent to java.util.TreeMap<K, V>) unless a comparison is provided. Unfortunately, compilers historically generate somewhat esoteric, long, and unhelpful error messages for this sort of error. Ensuring that a certain object adheres to a method protocol can alleviate this issue. Languages which use std::compare instead of < can also use std::complex<T> values as keys.

Another kind of template, a class template, extends the same concept to classes. A class template specialization is a class. Class templates are often used to make generic containers. For example, the STL has a doubly linked list container, std::list<T> (equivalent to java.util.LinkedList<T>). To make a linked list of integers, one writes list<int>, while a list of strings is denoted list<string>. A std::list<T> has a set of standard functions associated with it, that work for any compatible parameterizing types.

C++20 introduces constraining template types using concepts. Constraining the max() could look something like this:

import std;

using std::totally_ordered;

// in typename declaration:
template <totally_ordered T>
[[nodiscard]]
constexpr T max(T x, T y) noexcept {
    return x < y ? y : x;
}

// in requires clause:
template <typename T>
    requires totally_ordered<T>
[[nodiscard]]
constexpr T max(T x, T y) noexcept {
    return x < y ? y : x;
}

===== Template specialization =====
A powerful feature of C++'s templates is template specialization. This allows alternative implementations to be provided based on certain characteristics of the parameterized type that is being instantiated. Template specialization has two purposes: to allow certain forms of optimization, and to reduce code bloat.

For example, consider a sort() template function. One of the primary activities that such a function does is to swap or exchange the values in two of the container's positions. If the values are large (in terms of the number of bytes it takes to store each of them), then it is often quicker to first build a separate list of pointers to the objects, sort those pointers, and then build the final sorted sequence. If the values are quite small however it is usually fastest to just swap the values in-place as needed. Furthermore, if the parameterized type is already of some pointer-type, then there is no need to build a separate pointer array. Template specialization allows the template creator to write different implementations and to specify the characteristics that the parameterized type(s) must have for each implementation to be used.

Unlike function templates, class templates can be partially specialized. That means that an alternate version of the class template code can be provided when some of the template parameters are known, while leaving other template parameters generic. This can be used, for example, to create a default implementation (the primary specialization) that assumes that copying a parameterizing type is expensive and then create partial specializations for types that are cheap to copy, thus increasing overall efficiency. Clients of such a class template just use specializations of it without needing to know whether the compiler used the primary specialization or some partial specialization in each case. Class templates can also be fully specialized, which means that an alternate implementation can be provided when all of the parameterizing types are known.

===== Advantages and disadvantages =====
Some uses of templates, such as the max() function, were formerly filled by function-like preprocessor macros (a legacy of the C language). For example, here is a possible implementation of such macro:

#define max(a,b) ((a) < (b) ? (b) : (a))

Macros are expanded (copy pasted) by the preprocessor, before program compiling; templates are actual real functions. Macros are always expanded inline; templates can also be inline functions when the compiler deems it appropriate.

However, templates are generally considered an improvement over macros for these purposes. Templates are type-safe. Templates avoid some of the common errors found in code that makes heavy use of function-like macros, such as evaluating parameters with side effects twice. Perhaps most importantly, templates were designed to be applicable to much larger problems than macros.

There are four primary drawbacks to the use of templates: supported features, compiler support, poor error messages (usually with pre C++20 substitution failure is not an error (SFINAE)), and code bloat:

1. Templates in C++ lack many features, which makes implementing them and using them in a straightforward way often impossible. Instead programmers have to rely on complex tricks which leads to bloated, hard to understand and hard to maintain code. Current developments in the C++ standards exacerbate this problem by making heavy use of these tricks and building a lot of new features for templates on them or with them intended.
2. Many compilers historically had poor support for templates, thus the use of templates could make code somewhat less portable. Support may also be poor when a C++ compiler is being used with a linker that is not C++-aware, or when attempting to use templates across shared library boundaries.
3. Compilers can produce confusing, long, and sometimes unhelpful error messages when errors are detected in code that uses SFINAE. This can make templates difficult to develop with.
4. Finally, the use of templates requires the compiler to generate a separate instance of the templated class or function for every type parameters used with it. (This is necessary because types in C++ are not all the same size, and the sizes of data fields are important to how classes work.) So the indiscriminate use of templates can lead to code bloat, resulting in excessively large executables. However, judicious use of template specialization and derivation can dramatically reduce such code bloat in some cases:
  So, can derivation be used to reduce the problem of code replicated because templates are used? This would involve deriving a template from an ordinary class. This technique proved successful in curbing code bloat in real use. People who do not use a technique like this have found that replicated code can cost megabytes of code space even in moderate size programs.
  — Bjarne Stroustrup, The Design and Evolution of C++, 1994
5. Templated classes or functions may require an explicit specialization of the template class which would require rewriting of an entire class for a specific template parameters used by it.

The extra instantiations generated by templates can also cause some debuggers to have difficulty working gracefully with templates. For example, setting a debug breakpoint within a template from a source file may either miss setting the breakpoint in the actual instantiation desired or may set a breakpoint in every place the template is instantiated.

Also, the implementation source code for the template must be completely available (e.g. included in a header) to the translation unit (source file) using it. Templates, including much of the Standard Library, if not included in header files, cannot be compiled. (This is in contrast to non-templated code, which may be compiled to binary, providing only a declarations header file for code using it.) This may be a disadvantage by exposing the implementing code, which removes some abstractions, and could restrict its use in closed-source projects.

==== D ====
The D language supports templates based in design on C++. Most C++ template idioms work in D without alteration, but D adds some functionality:

- Template parameters in D are not restricted to just types and primitive values (as it was in C++ before C++20), but also allow arbitrary compile-time values (such as strings and struct literals), and aliases to arbitrary identifiers, including other templates or template instantiations.
- Template constraints and the static if statement provide an alternative to respectively C++'s C++ concepts and if constexpr.
- The is(...) expression allows speculative instantiation to verify an object's traits at compile time.
- The auto keyword and the typeof expression allow type inference for variable declarations and function return values, which in turn allows "Voldemort types" (types that do not have a global name).

Templates in D use a different syntax than in C++: whereas in C++ template parameters are wrapped in angular brackets (Template<param1, param2>), D uses an exclamation sign and parentheses: Template!(param1, param2). This avoids the C++ parsing difficulties due to ambiguity with comparison operators. If there is only one parameter, the parentheses can be omitted.

Conventionally, D combines the above features to provide compile-time polymorphism using trait-based generic programming. For example, an input range is defined as any type that satisfies the checks performed by isInputRange, which is defined as follows:

template isInputRange(R) {
    enum bool isInputRange = is(typeof((inout int = 0) {
        R r = R.init;     // can define a range object
        if (r.empty) {}   // can test for empty
        r.popFront();     // can invoke popFront()
        auto h = r.front; // can get the front of the range
    }));
}

A function that accepts only input ranges can then use the above template in a template constraint:

auto fun(Range)(Range range)
    if (isInputRange!Range) {
    // ...
}

===== Code generation =====
In addition to template metaprogramming, D also provides several features to enable compile-time code generation:

- The import expression allows reading a file from disk and using its contents as a string expression.
- Compile-time reflection allows enumerating and inspecting declarations and their members during compiling.
- User-defined attributes allow users to attach arbitrary identifiers to declarations, which can then be enumerated using compile-time reflection.
- Compile-time function execution (CTFE) allows a subset of D (restricted to safe operations) to be interpreted during compiling.
- String mixins allow evaluating and compiling the contents of a string expression as D code that becomes part of the program.

Combining the above allows generating code based on existing declarations. For example, D serialization frameworks can enumerate a type's members and generate specialized functions for each serialized type to perform serialization and deserialization. User-defined attributes could further indicate serialization rules.

The import expression and compile-time function execution also allow efficiently implementing domain-specific languages. For example, given a function that takes a string containing an HTML template and returns equivalent D source code, it is possible to use it in the following way:

// Import the contents of example.htt as a string manifest constant.
enum htmlTemplate = import("example.htt");

// Transpile the HTML template to D code.
enum htmlDCode = htmlTemplateToD(htmlTemplate);

// Paste the contents of htmlDCode as D code.
mixin(htmlDCode);

==== Eiffel ====
Generic classes have been a part of Eiffel since the original method and language design. The foundation publications of Eiffel, use the term genericity to describe creating and using generic classes.

===== Basic, unconstrained genericity =====
Generic classes are declared with their class name and a list of one or more formal generic parameters. In the following code, class LIST has one formal generic parameter G

class
    LIST [G]
            ...
feature   -- Access
    item: G
            -- The item currently pointed to by cursor
            ...
feature   -- Element change
    put (new_item: G)
            -- Add `new_item' at the end of the list
            ...

The formal generic parameters are placeholders for arbitrary class names that will be supplied when a declaration of the generic class is made, as shown in the two generic derivations below, where ACCOUNT and DEPOSIT are other class names. ACCOUNT and DEPOSIT are considered actual generic parameters as they provide real class names to substitute for G in actual use.

    list_of_accounts: LIST [ACCOUNT]
            -- Account list

    list_of_deposits: LIST [DEPOSIT]
            -- Deposit list

Within the Eiffel type system, although class LIST [G] is considered a class, it is not considered a type. However, a generic derivation of LIST [G] such as LIST [ACCOUNT] is considered a type.

===== Constrained genericity =====
For the list class shown above, an actual generic parameter substituting for G can be any other available class. To constrain the set of classes from which valid actual generic parameters can be chosen, a generic constraint can be specified. In the declaration of class SORTED_LIST below, the generic constraint dictates that any valid actual generic parameter will be a class that inherits from class COMPARABLE. The generic constraint ensures that elements of a SORTED_LIST can in fact be sorted.

class
    SORTED_LIST [G -> COMPARABLE]

==== Java ====
Support for the generics, or "containers-of-type-T" was added to the Java programming language in 2004 as part of J2SE 5.0. In Java, generics are only checked at compile time for type correctness. The generic type information is then removed via a process called type erasure, to maintain compatibility with old JVM implementations, making it unavailable at runtime. For example, a List<String> is converted to the raw type java.util.List. The compiler inserts type casts to convert the elements to the java.lang.String type when they are retrieved from the list, reducing performance compared to other implementations such as C++ templates.

==== .NET ====
Generics were added to .NET as part of .NET Framework 2.0 in November 2005, based on a research prototype from Microsoft Research begun in 1999. Although similar to generics in Java, .NET generics do not apply type erasure, but implement generics as a first class mechanism in the runtime using reification. This design choice provides additional functionality, such as allowing reflection with preservation of generic types, and alleviating some of the limits of erasure (such as being unable to create generic arrays). This also means that there is no performance hit from runtime casts and normally expensive boxing conversions. When primitive and value types are used as generic arguments, they get specialized implementations, allowing for efficient generic collections and methods. As in C++ and Java, nested generic types such as Dictionary<string, List<int>> are valid types, however are advised against for member signatures in code analysis design rules.

.NET allows six varieties of generic type constraints using the where keyword including restricting generic types to be value types, to be classes, to have constructors, and to implement interfaces. Below is an example with an interface constraint:

namespace Wikipedia.Examples;

using System;

public class Example
{
    static void MakeAtLeast<T>(T[] list, T lowest) where T : IComparable<T>
    {
        for (ref T item in list.AsSpan())
        {
            if (item.CompareTo(lowest) < 0)
            {
                item = lowest;
            }
        }
    }

    static void Main()
    {
        int[] a = [0, 1, 2, 3];
        MakeAtLeast<int>(a, 2); // Change a to [2, 2, 2, 3]
        foreach (int i in a)
        {
            Console.WriteLine(i); // Print results.
        }
        Console.ReadKey(true);
    }
}

The MakeAtLeast() method allows operation on arrays, with elements of generic type T. The method's type constraint indicates that the method is applicable to any type T that implements the generic System.IComparable<T> interface. This ensures a compile time error, if the method is called if the type does not support comparison. The interface provides the generic method CompareTo(T).

The above method could also be written without generic types, simply using the non-generic System.Array type. However, since arrays are contravariant, the casting would not be type safe, and the compiler would be unable to find certain possible errors that would otherwise be caught when using generic types. Also, the method would need to access the array items as objects instead, and would require casting to compare two elements. (For value types like types such as int this requires a boxing conversion, although this can be worked around using the System.Collections.Generic.Comparer<T> class, as is done in the standard collection classes.)

A notable behavior of static members in a generic .NET class is static member instantiation per run-time type (see example below).

namespace Wikipedia.Examples;

using System;

// A generic class
class GenericTest<T>
{
    // A static variable - will be created for each type on reflection
    static CountedInstances OnePerType = new();

    // A data member
    private T _t;

    // Default constructor
    public GenericTest(T t)
    {
        _t = t;
    }
}

// a class
class CountedInstances
{
    // Static variable - this will be incremented once per instance
    public static int Counter;

    // Default constructor
    public CountedInstances()
    {
        // Increase counter by one during object instantiation
        CountedInstances.Counter++;
    }
}

public class GenericExample 
{
    static void Main(string[] args) 
    {
        // Main code entry point
        // At the end of execution, CountedInstances.Counter = 2
        GenericTest<int> g1 = new(1);
        GenericTest<int> g11 = new(11);
        GenericTest<int> g111 = new(111);
        GenericTest<double> g2 = new(1.0);
    }
}

==== Pascal ====
For Pascal, generics were first implemented in 2006, in the implementation Free Pascal.

===== Delphi =====
The Object Pascal dialect Delphi acquired generics in the 2007 Delphi 11 release by CodeGear, initially only with the .NET compiler (since discontinued) before being added to the native code in the 2009 Delphi 12 release. The semantics and abilities of Delphi generics are largely modelled on those of generics in .NET 2.0, though the implementation is by necessity quite different. Here is a more or less direct translation of the first C# example shown above:

program Sample;

{$APPTYPE CONSOLE}

uses
  Generics.Defaults; //for IComparer<>

type
  TUtils = class
    class procedure MakeAtLeast<T>(Arr: TArray<T>; const Lowest: T;
      Comparer: IComparer<T>); overload;
    class procedure MakeAtLeast<T>(Arr: TArray<T>; const Lowest: T); overload;
  end;

class procedure TUtils.MakeAtLeast<T>(Arr: TArray<T>; const Lowest: T;
  Comparer: IComparer<T>);
var
  I: Integer;
begin
  if Comparer = nil then Comparer := TComparer<T>.Default;
  for I := Low(Arr) to High(Arr) do
    if Comparer.Compare(Arr[I], Lowest) < 0 then
      Arr[I] := Lowest;
end;

class procedure TUtils.MakeAtLeast<T>(Arr: TArray<T>; const Lowest: T);
begin
  MakeAtLeast<T>(Arr, Lowest, nil);
end;

var
  Ints: TArray<Integer>;
  Value: Integer;
begin
  Ints := TArray<Integer>.Create(0, 1, 2, 3);
  TUtils.MakeAtLeast<Integer>(Ints, 2);
  for Value in Ints do
    WriteLn(Value);
  ReadLn;
end.

As with C#, methods and whole types can have one or more type parameters. In the example, TArray is a generic type (defined by the language) and MakeAtLeast a generic method. The available constraints are very similar to the available constraints in C#: any value type, any class, a specific class or interface, and a class with a parameterless constructor. Multiple constraints act as an additive union.

===== Free Pascal =====
Free Pascal implemented generics in 2006 in version 2.2.0, before Delphi and with different syntax and semantics. However, since FPC version 2.6.0, the Delphi-style syntax is available when using the language mode {$mode Delphi}. Thus, Free Pascal code supports generics in either style.

Delphi and Free Pascal example:

// Delphi style
unit A;

{$ifdef fpc}
  {$mode delphi}
{$endif}

interface

type
  TGenericClass<T> = class
    function Foo(const AValue: T): T;
  end;

implementation

function TGenericClass<T>.Foo(const AValue: T): T;
begin
  Result := AValue + AValue;
end;

end.

// Free Pascal's ObjFPC style
unit B;

{$ifdef fpc}
  {$mode objfpc}
{$endif}

interface

type
  generic TGenericClass<T> = class
    function Foo(const AValue: T): T;
  end;

implementation

function TGenericClass.Foo(const AValue: T): T;
begin
  Result := AValue + AValue;
end;

end.

// example usage, Delphi style
program TestGenDelphi;

{$ifdef fpc}
  {$mode delphi}
{$endif}

uses
  A,B;

var
  GC1: A.TGenericClass<Integer>;
  GC2: B.TGenericClass<String>;
begin
  GC1 := A.TGenericClass<Integer>.Create;
  GC2 := B.TGenericClass<String>.Create;
  WriteLn(GC1.Foo(100)); // 200
  WriteLn(GC2.Foo('hello')); // hellohello
  GC1.Free;
  GC2.Free;
end.

// example usage, ObjFPC style
program TestGenDelphi;

{$ifdef fpc}
  {$mode objfpc}
{$endif}

uses
  A,B;

// required in ObjFPC
type
  TAGenericClassInt = specialize A.TGenericClass<Integer>;
  TBGenericClassString = specialize B.TGenericClass<String>;
var
  GC1: TAGenericClassInt;
  GC2: TBGenericClassString;
begin
  GC1 := TAGenericClassInt.Create;
  GC2 := TBGenericClassString.Create;
  WriteLn(GC1.Foo(100)); // 200
  WriteLn(GC2.Foo('hello')); // hellohello
  GC1.Free;
  GC2.Free;
end.

=== Functional languages ===
==== Genericity in Haskell ====
The type class mechanism of Haskell supports generic programming. Six of the predefined type classes in Haskell (including Eq, the types that can be compared for equality, and Show, the types whose values can be rendered as strings) have the special property of supporting derived instances. This means that a programmer defining a new type can state that this type is to be an instance of one of these special type classes, without providing implementations of the class methods as is usually necessary when declaring class instances. All the necessary methods will be "derived" – that is, constructed automatically – based on the structure of the type. For example, the following declaration of a type of binary trees states that it is to be an instance of the classes Eq and Show:

data BinTree a = Leaf a | Node (BinTree a) a (BinTree a)
      deriving (Eq, Show)

This results in an equality function (==) and a string representation function (show) being automatically defined for any type of the form BinTree T provided that T itself supports those operations.

The support for derived instances of Eq and Show makes their methods == and show generic in a qualitatively different way from parametrically polymorphic functions: these "functions" (more accurately, type-indexed families of functions) can be applied to values of various types, and although they behave differently for every argument type, little work is needed to add support for a new type. Ralf Hinze (2004) has shown that a similar effect can be achieved for user-defined type classes by certain programming techniques. Other researchers have proposed approaches to this and other kinds of genericity in the context of Haskell and extensions to Haskell (discussed below).

===== PolyP =====
PolyP was the first generic programming language extension to Haskell. In PolyP, generic functions are called polytypic. The language introduces a special construct in which such polytypic functions can be defined via structural induction over the structure of the pattern functor of a regular datatype. Regular datatypes in PolyP are a subset of Haskell datatypes. A regular datatype t must be of kind * → *, and if a is the formal type argument in the definition, then all recursive calls to t must have the form t a. These restrictions rule out higher-kinded datatypes and nested datatypes, where the recursive calls are of a different form. The flatten function in PolyP is here provided as an example:

   flatten :: Regular d => d a -> [a]
   flatten = cata fl

   polytypic fl :: f a [a] -> [a]
     case f of
       g+h -> either fl fl
       g*h -> \(x,y) -> fl x ++ fl y
       () -> \x -> []
       Par -> \x -> [x]
       Rec -> \x -> x
       d@g -> concat . flatten . pmap fl
       Con t -> \x -> []

   cata :: Regular d => (FunctorOf d a b -> b) -> d a -> b

===== Generic Haskell =====
Generic Haskell is another extension to Haskell, developed at Utrecht University in the Netherlands. The extensions it provides are:

- Type-indexed values are defined as a value indexed over the various Haskell type constructors (unit, primitive types, sums, products, and user-defined type constructors). In addition, we can also specify the behaviour of a type-indexed values for a specific constructor using constructor cases, and reuse one generic definition in another using default cases.

The resulting type-indexed value can be specialized to any type.

- Kind-indexed types are types indexed over kinds, defined by giving a case for both * and k → k'. Instances are obtained by applying the kind-indexed type to a kind.
- Generic definitions can be used by applying them to a type or kind. This is called generic application. The result is a type or value, depending on which sort of generic definition is applied.
- Generic abstraction enables generic definitions be defined by abstracting a type parameter (of a given kind).
- Type-indexed types are types that are indexed over the type constructors. These can be used to give types to more involved generic values. The resulting type-indexed types can be specialized to any type.

As an example, the equality function in Generic Haskell:

   type Eq {[ * ]} t1 t2 = t1 -> t2 -> Bool
   type Eq {[ k -> l ]} t1 t2 = forall u1 u2. Eq {[ k ]} u1 u2 -> Eq {[ l ]} (t1 u1) (t2 u2)

   eq {| t :: k |} :: Eq {[ k ]} t t
   eq {| Unit |} _ _ = True
   eq {| :+: |} eqA eqB (Inl a1) (Inl a2) = eqA a1 a2
   eq {| :+: |} eqA eqB (Inr b1) (Inr b2) = eqB b1 b2
   eq {| :+: |} eqA eqB _ _ = False
   eq {| :*: |} eqA eqB (a1 :*: b1) (a2 :*: b2) = eqA a1 a2 && eqB b1 b2
   eq {| Int |} = (==)
   eq {| Char |} = (==)
   eq {| Bool |} = (==)

==== Clean ====
Clean offers generic programming based PolyP and the Generic Haskell as supported by the GHC ≥ 6.0. It parametrizes by kind as those but offers overloading.

=== Other languages ===
Languages in the ML family support generic programming through parametric polymorphism and generic modules called functors. Both Standard ML and OCaml provide functors, which are similar to class templates and to Ada's generic packages. Scheme syntactic abstractions also have a connection to genericity – these are in fact a superset of C++ templates.

A Verilog module may take one or more parameters, to which their actual values are assigned upon the instantiation of the module. One example is a generic register array where the array width is given via a parameter. Such an array, combined with a generic wire vector, can make a generic buffer or memory module with an arbitrary bit width out of a single module implementation.

VHDL, being derived from Ada, also has generic abilities.

C has a feature called "type-generic expressions" using the _Generic keyword: This feature gives C function overloading capabilities, but is not related to generic programming. Generic programming can be achieved by using the preprocessor to define the generic code, with macro expansion taking the role of instantiation. Sometimes, the non-standard extension "statement expressions" is used to simulate function-like behaviour for generic code. Combining this two features enables implementing a generic max function, similar to std::max in c++:

#define max(a,b) \
        ({ typeof (a) _a = (a); \
           typeof (b) _b = (b); \
           _a > _b ? _a : _b; })

== See also ==
- Concept (generic programming)
- Partial evaluation
- Template metaprogramming
- Type polymorphism

== Sources ==
- Albahari, Joseph (2022). C# 10 in a Nutshell (First ed.). O'Reilly. ISBN 978-1-098-12195-2.
- Bloch, Joshua (2018). "Effective Java: Programming Language Guide" (third ed.). Addison-Wesley. ISBN 978-0-13-468599-1.
- Musser, D. R.; Stepanov, A. A. (1989). "Generic programming". In P. Gianni (ed.). Symbolic and Algebraic Computation: International symposium ISSAC 1988. Lecture Notes in Computer Science. Vol. 358. pp. 13–25. doi:10.1007/3-540-51084-2_2. ISBN 978-3-540-51084-0.
- Stroustrup, Bjarne (2007). Evolving a language in and for the real world: C++ 1991-2006 (PDF). ACM HOPL 2007.
- Gamma, Erich; Helm, Richard; Johnson, Ralph; Vlissides, John (1994). Design Patterns: Elements of Reusable Object-Oriented Software. Addison-Wesley. Bibcode:1995dper.book.....G. ISBN 0-201-63361-2.
