= List of object-oriented programming languages =

This is a list of notable programming languages with features designed for object-oriented programming (OOP).

The listed languages are designed with varying degrees of OOP support. Some are highly focused in OOP while others support multiple paradigms including OOP. For example, C++ is a multi-paradigm language including OOP; however, it is less object-oriented than other languages such as Python and Ruby.

Scratch has most qualities of an OOP, however it doesn't fully qualify.

== Languages with object-oriented features ==
- ABAP
- Ada 95
- AmigaE
- Apex
- BETA
- Boo
- C++
- C#
- Ceylon
- Chapel
- Clarion
- CLU
- COBOL
- Cobra
- ColdFusion
- Common Lisp
- CorbaScript
- Curl
- D
- Dart
- DataFlex
- Dylan
- E
- Eiffel
  - Sather
- Elixir
- Fortran 2003
- FreeBASIC
- F#
- Gambas
- GDScript
- Go
- Graphtalk
- IDLscript
- J
- J#
- JADE
- Java
  - Groovy
  - Join Java
  - X10
- Julia
- Kotlin
- Lasso
- Lingo
- Lisp
- Logtalk
- MATLAB
- Modula-3
- Nemerle
- NetRexx
- Nim
- Noop
- Oberon (Oberon-1)
  - Oberon-2
- Object Pascal
  - Delphi
  - Free Pascal
  - Turbo Pascal
- Object REXX
- Objective-C
- OCaml
- Omnis Studio
- OpenEdge Advanced Business Language
- Oz, Mozart Programming System
- Perl since v5
- PHP since v4, greatly enhanced in v5
- Power Builder
- Prototype-based languages
  - Actor-Based Concurrent Languages: ABCL/1, ABCL/R, ABCL/R2, ABCL/c+
  - Agora
  - Cecil
  - ECMAScript
    - ActionScript
    - JavaScript
    - JScript
  - Etoys (in Squeak)
  - Io
  - Lua
  - MOO
  - NewtonScript
  - Obliq
  - REBOL
  - Self
- Python
- REALbasic
- Ruby
- Rust
- S
  - R
- Scala
- Scriptol
- Seed7
- SenseTalk
- Simula
- Smalltalk
  - Self
  - Squeak
    - Pharo
    - Newspeak
- Squirrel
- Swift
- TADS
- Tcl
  - Xotcl (similar to CLOS)
  - incr Tcl (itcl; similar to C++)
- Transcript
- TypeScript
- Ubercode
- Vala
- Verse
- Visual Basic
  - Visual Basic .NET (VB.NET)
  - VBScript
  - Visual Basic for Applications (VBA)
- Visual FoxPro
- Visual Prolog
- Xojo
- ZZT-oop

== See also ==
- Category:Object-oriented programming languages
