= List of C-family programming languages =

The C-family programming languages share significant features of the C programming language. Many of these 70 languages were influenced by C due to its success and ubiquity. The family also includes predecessors that influenced C's design such as BCPL.

Notable programming sources use terms like C-style, C-like, a dialect of C, having C-like syntax. The term curly bracket programming language denotes a language that shares C's block syntax.

C-family languages have features like:

- Code block delimited by curly braces ({}), a.k.a. braces, a.k.a. curly brackets
- Semicolon (;) statement terminator
- Parameter list delimited by parentheses (())
- Infix notation for arithmetical and logical expressions

C-family languages span multiple programming paradigms, conceptual models, and run-time environments.

Language	Year begun	Created by (at)	Brief description, relationship to C	References
Agora	1993	Dr. Patrick Steyaert	A reflective, prototype-based, object-oriented programming language that is based exclusively on message passing and not delegation.	
Alef	1995	Phil Winterbottom (Bell Labs)	Created for systems programming on the Plan 9 from Bell Labs operating system; published in 1995 and eventually abandoned. It provided substantial language support for concurrent programming.	
Amiga E	1993	Wouter van Oortmerssen	A combination of many features from several languages, but follows the original C language most closely in basic concepts.	
AMPL	1985	Robert Fourer, David Gay and Brian Kernighan (Bell Labs)	An algebraic modeling language with elements of a scripting language.	
AWK	1977	Alfred Aho, Peter Weinberger & Brian Kernighan (Bell Labs)	Designed for text processing and typically used as a data extraction and reporting tool.	
Axum	2009	Microsoft	A domain specific concurrent language, based on the actor model.	
BCPL	1966	Martin Richards	A procedural, imperative, and structured language. Precursor to C.	
C	1969–1973	Dennis Ritchie (Bell Labs)	Enhancement of Ken Thompson's B language.	
C shell/tcsh	1978	Bill Joy (UC Berkeley)	Scripting language and standard Unix shell.	
C*	1987	Thinking Machines	Object-oriented, data-parallel ANSI C superset.	
C++	1979	Bjarne Stroustrup (Bell Labs)	Named as "C with Classes" and renamed C++ in 1983; it began as a reimplementation of static object orientation in the tradition of Simula 67, and through standardization and wide use has grown to encompass generic programming as well as its original object-oriented roots.	
C--	1997	Simon Peyton Jones, Norman Ramsey	Generated mainly by compilers for very high-level languages.	
Cg	2002	Nvidia	Based on the C language and although they share the same syntax, some features of C were modified and new data types were added to make Cg more suitable for programming graphics processing units. This language is only suitable for GPU programming and is not a general programming language.	
Ch	2001	Harry Cheng	A C/C++ scripting language with extensions for shell programming and numerical computing.	
Chapel	2009	Cray Inc.	Aims to improve the programmability of parallel computers in general and the Cray Cascade system in particular.	
Charm	1996	P. Nowosad	An object-oriented language with similarities to the RTL/2, Pascal and C languages in addition to containing some unique features of its own.	
Cilk	1994	MIT Laboratory for Computer Science	General-purpose language designed for multithreaded parallel computing.	
CINT	1997–1999?	Masaharu Goto	An interpreted version of C/C++, much in the way BeanShell is an interpreted version of Java.	
Claire	1994	Yves Caseau	A high-level functional and object-oriented language with rule processing abilities.	
Cyclone	2001	Greg Morrisett (AT&T Labs)	Intended to be a safe dialect of the C language. It is designed to avoid buffer overflows and other vulnerabilities that are endemic in C programs, without losing the power and convenience of C as a tool for system programming.	
C#	2000	Anders Hejlsberg	Developed by Microsoft in the early 2000s as a modern, object-oriented language for the .NET framework.	
D	2001	Walter Bright (Digital Mars)	Based on C++, but with an incompatible syntax having traits from other C-like languages like Java and C#.	
Dart	2013	Lars Bak and Kasper Lund (Google)	A class-based, single inheritance, object-oriented language with C-style syntax.	
E	1997	Mark S. Miller, Dan Bornstein (Electric Communities)	Designed with secure computing in mind, accomplished chiefly by strict adherence to the object-oriented computing model.	
eC	2004	Jérôme Jacovella-St-Louis (Ecere)	A super-set of C adding object-oriented features (inspired by C++), properties, dynamic modules and reflection developed as part of the Ecere SDK project, an open-source cross-platform SDK.	
Embedded C	2004	WG14	A nonstandard extensions to the C language to support enhanced microprocessor features	
Fantom	2005	Brian Frank and Andy Frank	An object-oriented, functional, actor concurrent with a null-able aware type system emphasizing pragmatism in building enterprise systems running on top of the JVM or the CLR or JavaScript.	
Fusion (formerly Ć)	2011	Piotr Fusik and Adrian Matoga	Fusion is a language based on C and C#. Aimed at crafting portable programming libraries, with syntax akin to C#. The translated code is lightweight (no virtual machine, emulation nor large runtime).	
Go	2007	Rob Pike, Ken Thompson, and Robert Griesemer (Google)	Released to public in 2009, it is a concurrent language with fast compilations, Java-like syntax, but no object-oriented features and strong typing.	
Hack	2014	Julien Verlaguet, Alok Menghrajani, Drew Paroski (Facebook)	A language for the HipHop Virtual Machine (HHVM).	
Handel-C	1996	Oxford University Computing Laboratory	A high-level language which targets low-level hardware, most commonly used in the programming of FPGAs. It is a rich subset of C.	
HolyC	2005	Terry A. Davis	A dialect of C for Terry's own operating system TempleOS.	
Java	1991	James Gosling (Sun Microsystems)	Created as Oak, and released to the public in 1995. It is an OODL based inspired heavily by Objective-C, though with a syntax based somewhat on C++. Compiles to its own bytecode, and is strongly typed.	
JavaScript	1995	Brendan Eich (Netscape)	Created as Mocha and LiveScript, announced in 1995, shipped the next year as JavaScript. Primarily a scripting language used in Web page development as well as numerous application environments such as Adobe Flash and QtScript. Though initially based on Scheme and Self, it is primarily a prototype-based object-oriented language with a syntax based on Java. Standardized as ECMAScript.	
Limbo	1995		Limbo succeeded Alef and is used in Inferno as Alef was used in Plan9.	
LSL	2003	Robin Liden	Created for the Second Life virtual world by Linden Lab.	
Lite-C	2007	Atari Inc	A language for multimedia applications and personal computer games, using a syntax subset of the C language with some elements of the C++ language.	
LPC	1995	Lars Pensjö	Developed originally to facilitate MUD building on LPMuds. Though designed for game development, its flexibility has led to it being used for various purposes.	
Neko	2005	Nicolas Cannasse (Motion-Twin)	A high-level dynamically typed language.	
Nemerle	2003	Kamil Skalski, Michał Moskal, Prof. Leszek Pacholski, Paweł Olszta at Wrocław University	A general-purpose high-level statically typed language designed for platforms using the Common Language Infrastructure (.NET/Mono).	
nesC	2003	David Gay, Philip Levis, Robert von Behren, Matt Welsh, Eric Brewer, & David Culler	Pronounced "NES-see", it is an extension to the C language designed to embody the structuring concepts and execution model of TinyOS, an event-driven operating system designed for sensor network nodes with very limited resources.	
Newsqueak	1988	Rob Pike	A concurrent language for writing application software with interactive graphical user interfaces, the syntax and semantics are influenced by the C language, but its approach to concurrency was inspired by Communicating sequential processes (CSP).	
Nim	2008	Andreas Rumpf	An imperative, multi-paradigm, compiled language.	
Noop	2009	Google	Attempts to blend the best features of "old" and "new" languages, while syntactically encouraging good programming practice.	
Not eXactly C (NXC)	2006	John Hansen	A high-level language for the Lego Mindstorms NXT. NXC, which is short for Not eXactly C, is based on Next Byte Codes, an assembly language. NXC has a syntax like C. It is part of the BricX IDE that integrates editor, tools for interfacing with the brick, and the compiler, but supports more languages.	
Not Quite C (NQC)	1998 (approx.)	David Baum	An embedded systems programming language, application programming interface (API), and native bytecode compiler toolkit for the Lego Mindstorms RCX platform, Cybermaster and LEGO Spybotics systems. It is intended as a drop-in replacement for the LabVIEW-based ROBOLAB IDE. It is primarily based on the C language but has specific limits, such as a maximum number of subroutines and variables allowed. Later replaced with Not eXactly C (NXC), an enhanced version created for the Mindstorms NXT platform.	
Nytril	2017	Shawn McCreight and John Colbert	A fusion of a classic object-oriented programming language and a document markup language. Unique syntax extensions like revisions and affinity allow for easy document markup with computation side-by-side.	
Oak	1991	James Gosling (Sun Microsystems)	A language created initially for Sun Microsystems set-top box project, it later evolved to become Java.	
Objective-C	1986	Brad Cox and Tom Love	An object-oriented dynamic language based heavily on Smalltalk. A loosely defined de facto standard library by the original developers has now largely been displaced by OpenStep FoundationKit variants.	
OpenCL C	2009	Apple, Khronos Group	OpenCL specifies a modified subset of the C language for writing programs to run on various compute devices, e.g., GPUs, DSPs.	
Perl	1988	Larry Wall	Scripting language used extensively for system administration, text processing, and web server tasks.	
PHP	1995	Rasmus Lerdorf	Widely used as a server-side scripting language. C-like syntax.	
Pike	1994	Fredrik Hübinette	An interpreted, general-purpose, high-level, cross-platform, dynamic programming language, with a syntax similar to that of C.	
PROMAL	1985	Systems Management Associates	A C-like language for MS-DOS, Commodore 64, and Apple II.	
R	1993	Ross Ihaka and Robert Gentleman	A language and software environment for statistical computing and graphics.	
Ratfor	1974	Brian Kernighan (Bell Labs)	A hybrid of C and Fortran, implemented as a preprocessor for environments with no easy access to C compilers.	
Ruby	1995	Yukihiro Matsumoto	An interpreted, high-level, general-purpose language which supports multiple programming paradigms.	
Rust	2010	Graydon Hoare (Mozilla)	A language empowering everyone to build reliable and efficient software.	
S-Lang	1991	John E. Davis	A library with a powerful interpreter that provides facilities required by interactive applications such as display/screen management, keyboard input, keymaps, etc.	
SA-C	2001	Cameron Project	Single Assignment C (SA-C) is designed to be directly and intuitively translatable into circuits, including FPGAs.	
SAC	1994	(Germany)	Development spread to several institutions in Germany, Canada, and the UK. Functional language with C syntax.	
Seed7	2005	Thomas Mertes	An extensible general-purpose language.	
Split-C	1993	?	A parallel extension of the C language.	
Squirrel	2003	Alberto Demichelis	A light-weight scripting language.	
Swift	2014	Chris Lattner (Apple)	Swift can import any C library, optionally annotating C headers to map C types to Swift objects and import libraries as Swift modules. Swift has two-way bridging with Objective-C on platforms which support Apple's Objective-C runtime. Unlike Objective-C, Swift does not currently support C++ interoperation or exposing Swift types as C structs.	
Telescript	1990	Marc Porat	An object-oriented language.	
TypeScript	2012	Microsoft	JavaScript superset.	
Umple	2008	University of Ottawa	A language for both object-oriented programming and modeling with class diagrams and state diagrams.	
Unified Parallel C	2003	?	An extension of the C language designed for high-performance computing on large-scale parallel machines.	
V (Vlang)	2019	Alexander Medvednikov	A general-purpose statically typed compiled language for ease of use, safety, speed, and maintainable software.	
Zig	2015	Andrew Kelley	A general-purpose language and toolchain for maintaining robust, optimal, and reusable software.	
