= ACBL =

ACBL may refer to:

- Actor-Based Concurrent Language, a family of programming languages
- Adarsh Co-operative Bank, in India
- American Contract Bridge League, a bridge membership organization in North America
- Atlantic Collegiate Baseball League, located in the US Mid-Atlantic region

== See also ==
- ABCL (disambiguation)
