= ABCL =

ABCL may refer to:

- Actor-Based Concurrent Language
- American Birth Control League
- Amitabh Bachchan Corporation
- Armed Bear Common Lisp
- Automatic Barrier Crossing Locally monitored, a type of level crossing in the UK

== See also ==
- ACBL (disambiguation)
