= Craig Chambers =

American computer scientist

- Known for: Creating Cecil, Diesel programming languages

Craig Chambers is a computer scientist. He worked at Google from 2007 to 2022. Prior to Google, he was a professor in the department of computer science and engineering at the University of Washington. He received his B.S. degree in computer science from MIT in 1986 and his Ph.D. in computer science from Stanford in 1992. He is best known for the influential research language Self, which introduced prototypes as an alternative to classes, and code-splitting, a compilation technique that generates separate code paths for fast and general cases to speed execution of dynamically typed programs. He was the PhD advisor of Google's former chief scientist, Jeff Dean.
