= Multiple dispatch =

Feature of some programming languages

Multiple dispatch or multimethods is a feature of some programming languages in which a function or method can be dynamically dispatched based on the run-time (dynamic) type or, in the more general case, some other attribute of more than one of its arguments. This is a generalization of single-dispatch polymorphism where a function or method call is dynamically dispatched based on the derived type of the object on which the method has been called. Multiple dispatch routes the dynamic dispatch to the implementing function or method using the combined characteristics of one or more arguments.

== Understanding dispatch ==
Developers of computer software typically organize source code into named blocks variously called subroutines, procedures, subprograms, functions, or methods. The code in the function is executed by calling it – executing a piece of code that references its name. This transfers control temporarily to the called function; when the function's execution has completed, control is typically transferred back to the instruction in the caller that follows the reference.

Function names are usually selected so as to be descriptive of the function's purpose. It is sometimes desirable to give several functions the same name, often because they perform conceptually similar tasks, but operate on different types of input data. In such cases, the name reference at the function call site is not sufficient for identifying the block of code to be executed. Instead, the number and type of the arguments to the function call are also used to select among several function implementations.

In more conventional, i.e., single-dispatch object-oriented programming languages, when invoking a method (sending a message in Smalltalk, calling a member function in C++), one of its arguments is treated specially and used to determine which of the (potentially many) classes of methods of that name is to be applied. In many languages, the special argument is indicated syntactically; for example, a number of programming languages put the special argument before a dot in making a method call: special.method(other, arguments, here), so that lion.sound() would produce a roar, whereas sparrow.sound() would produce a chirp.

In contrast, in languages with multiple dispatch, the selected method is simply the one whose arguments match the number and type of the function call. There is no special argument that owns the function/method carried out in a particular call.

Multiple dispatch should be distinguished from function overloading, in which static typing information, such as a term's declared or inferred type (or base type in a language with subtyping) is used to determine which of several possibilities will be used at a given call site, and that determination is made at compile or link time (or some other time before program execution starts) and is thereafter invariant for a given deployment or run of the program. Many languages such as C++ offer robust function overloading but do not offer dynamic multiple dispatch (C++ only permits dynamic single dispatch through use of virtual functions).

=== Data types ===
When working with languages that can discriminate data types at compile time, selecting among the alternatives can occur then. The act of creating such alternative functions for compile time selection is usually referred to as overloading a function.

In programming languages that defer data type identification until run time (i.e., late binding), selection among alternative functions must occur then, based on the dynamically determined types of function arguments. Functions whose alternative implementations are selected in this manner are referred to most generally as multimethods.

There is some run-time cost associated with dynamically dispatching function calls. In some languages, the distinction between overloading and multimethods can be blurred, with the compiler determining whether compile time selection can be applied to a given function call, or whether slower run time dispatch is needed.

=== Issues ===
There are several known issues with dynamic-dispatch, both single and multiple. While many of these issues are solved for single-dispatch, which has been a standard feature in object-oriented programming languages for decades, these issues become more complicated in the multiple-dispatch case.

==== Expressiveness and modularity ====
In most popular programming languages, source code is delivered and deployed in granules of functionality which we will here call packages; actual terminology for this concept varies between language. Each package may contain multiple type, value, and function definitions, packages are often compiled separately in languages with a compilation step, and a non-cyclical dependency relationship may exist. A complete program is a set of packages, with a main package which may depend on several other packages, and the whole program consisting of the transitive closure of the dependency relationship.

The so-called expression problem relates to the ability for code in a depending package to extend behaviors (functions or datatypes) defined in a base package from within an including package, without modifying the source to the base package. Traditional single-dispatch OO languages make it trivial to add new datatypes but not new functions; traditional functional languages tend to have the opposite effect, and multiple dispatch, if implemented correctly, allows both. It is desirable for an implementation of multiple dispatch to have the following properties:

- It is possible to define different "cases" of a multi-method from within different packages without modifying the source of a base package.
- Inclusion of another package in the program should not change the behavior of a given multi-method call, when the call does not use any datatypes defined in the package.
- Conversely, if a datatype is defined in a given package, and a multi-method extension using that type is also defined in the same package, and a value of that type is passed (through a base type reference or into a generic function) into another package with no dependency on that package, and then the multi-method is invoked with that value as an argument, the multi-method case defined in the package which includes the type should be employed. To put it another way—within a given program, the same multi-method invoked with the same set of arguments should resolve to the same implementation, regardless of the location of the call site, and whether or not a given definition is "in scope" or "visible" at the point of the method call.

==== Ambiguity ====
It is generally desirable that for any given invocation of a multi-method, there be at most one "best" candidate among implementation cases of the multi-method, and/or that if there is not, that this be resolved in a predictable and deterministic fashion, including failure. Non-deterministic behavior is undesirable. Assuming a set of types with a non-circular subtyping relationship, one can define that one implementation of a multi-method is "better" (more specific) if all dynamically-dispatched arguments in the first are subtypes of all dynamically-dispatched arguments specified in the second, and at least one is a strict subtype. With single dispatch and in the absence of multiple inheritance, this condition is trivially satisfied, but with multiple dispatch, it is possible for two or more candidates to satisfy a given actual argument list, but neither is more specific than the other (one dynamic argument being the subtype in one case, another being the subtype in the other case). This particularly can happen if two different packages, neither depending on the other, both extend some multi-method with implementations concerning each package's types, and then a third package that includes both (possibly indirectly) then invokes the multi-method using arguments from both packages.

Possible resolutions include:

- Treating any ambiguous calls as an error. This might be caught at compile time (or otherwise before deployment), but might not be detected until runtime and produce a runtime error.
- Ordering the arguments, so e.g. the case with the most specific first argument is selected, and subsequent arguments are not considered for ambiguity resolution unless the first argument is insufficient to resolve the issue.
- Construction of other rules for resolving an ambiguity in one direction or another. Sometimes, such rules might be arbitrary and surprising. In the rules for static overload resolution in C++, for instance, a type which matches exactly is understandably considered a better match than a type which matches through a base type reference or a generic (template) parameter. However, if the only possible matches are either through a base type or a generic parameter, the generic parameter is preferred over the base type, a rule that sometimes produces surprising behavior.

==== Efficiency ====
Efficient implementation of single-dispatch, including in programming languages that are separately compiled to object code and linked with a low-level (not-language-aware) linker, including dynamically at program load/start time or even under the direction of the application code, are well known. The "vtable" method developed in C++ and other early OO languages (where each class has an array of function pointers corresponding to that class's virtual functions) is nearly as fast as a static method call, requiring O(1) overhead and only one additional memory lookup even in the un-optimized case. However, the vtable method uses the function name and not the argument type as its lookup key, and does not scale to the multiple dispatch case. (It also depends on the object-oriented paradigm of methods being features of classes, not standalone entities independent of any particular datatype).

Efficient implementation of multiple-dispatch remains an ongoing research problem.

=== Use in practice ===
To estimate how often multiple dispatch is used in practice, Muschevici et al. studied programs that use dynamic dispatch. They analyzed nine applications, mostly compilers, written in six different languages: Common Lisp Object System, Dylan, Cecil, MultiJava, Diesel, and Nice. Their results show that 13–32% of generic functions use the dynamic type of one argument, while 2.7–6.5% of them use the dynamic type of multiple arguments. The remaining 65–93% of generic functions have one concrete method (overrider), and thus are not considered to use the dynamic types of their arguments. Further, the study reports that 2–20% of generic functions had two and 3–6% had three concrete function implementations. The numbers decrease rapidly for functions with more concrete overriders.

Multiple dispatch is used much more heavily in Julia, where multiple dispatch was a central design concept from the origin of the language: collecting the same statistics as Muschevici on the average number of methods per generic function, it was found that the Julia standard library uses more than double the amount of overloading than in the other languages analyzed by Muschevici, and more than 10 times in the case of binary operators.

The data from these papers is summarized in the following table, where the dispatch ratio DR is the average number of methods per generic function; the choice ratio CR is the mean of the square of the number of methods (to better measure the frequency of functions with a large number of methods); and the degree of specialization DoS is the average number of type-specialized arguments per method (i.e., the number of arguments that are dispatched on):

Language	Average # methods (DR)	Choice ratio (CR)	Degree of specialization (DoS)
Cecil	2.33	63.30	1.06
Common Lisp (CMU)	2.03	6.34	1.17
Common Lisp (McCLIM)	2.32	15.43	1.17
Common Lisp (Steel Bank)	2.37	26.57	1.11
Diesel	2.07	31.65	0.71
Dylan (Gwydion)	1.74	18.27	2.14
Dylan (OpenDylan)	2.51	43.84	1.23
Julia	5.86	51.44	1.54
Julia (operators only)	28.13	78.06	2.01
MultiJava	1.50	8.92	1.02
Nice	1.36	3.46	0.33

=== Theory ===
The theory of multiple dispatching languages was first developed by Castagna et al., by defining a model for overloaded functions with late binding. It yielded the first formalization of the problem of type variance (covariance and contravariance) of object-oriented languages and a solution to the problem of binary methods.

== Examples ==
Distinguishing multiple and single dispatch may be made clearer by an example. Imagine a game that has, among its (user-visible) objects, spaceships and asteroids. When two objects collide, the program may need to do different things according to what has just hit what.

=== Languages with built-in multiple dispatch ===
==== C# ====
C# introduced support for dynamic multimethods in version 4 (April 2010) using the 'dynamic' keyword. The following example demonstrates multimethods. Like many other statically-typed languages, C# also supports static method overloading. Microsoft expects that developers will choose static typing over dynamic typing in most scenarios. The 'dynamic' keyword supports interoperability with COM objects and dynamically-typed .NET languages.

The example below uses features introduced in C# 9 and C# 10.

using static ColliderLibrary;

Console.WriteLine(Collide(new Asteroid(101), new Spaceship(300)));
Console.WriteLine(Collide(new Asteroid(10), new Spaceship(10)));
Console.WriteLine(Collide(new Spaceship(101), new Spaceship(10)));

string Collide(SpaceObject x, SpaceObject y) =>
    x.Size > 100 && y.Size > 100
        ? "Big boom!"
        : CollideWith(x as dynamic, y as dynamic); // Dynamic dispatch to CollideWith method

class ColliderLibrary
{
    public static string CollideWith(Asteroid x, Asteroid y) => "a/a";
    public static string CollideWith(Asteroid x, Spaceship y) => "a/s";
    public static string CollideWith(Spaceship x, Asteroid y) => "s/a";
    public static string CollideWith(Spaceship x, Spaceship y) => "s/s";
}

abstract record SpaceObject(int Size);
record Asteroid(int Size) : SpaceObject(Size);
record Spaceship(int Size) : SpaceObject(Size);

Output:

Big boom!
a/s
s/s

==== Groovy ====
Groovy is a general purpose Java compatible/interusable JVM language, which, contrary to Java, uses late binding / multiple dispatch.

/*
    Groovy implementation of C# example above
    Late binding works the same when using non-static methods or compiling class/methods statically
    (@CompileStatic annotation)
*/
class Program {
    static void main(String[] args) {
        println Collider.collide(new Asteroid(101), new Spaceship(300))
        println Collider.collide(new Asteroid(10), new Spaceship(10))
        println Collider.collide(new Spaceship(101), new Spaceship(10))
    }
}

class Collider {
    static String collide(SpaceObject x, SpaceObject y) {
        (x.size > 100 && y.size > 100) ? "big-boom" : collideWith(x, y)  // Dynamic dispatch to collideWith method
    }

    private static String collideWith(Asteroid x, Asteroid y) { "a/a" }
    private static String collideWith(Asteroid x, Spaceship y) { "a/s" }
    private static String collideWith(Spaceship x, Asteroid y) { "s/a" }
    private static String collideWith(Spaceship x, Spaceship y) { "s/s"}
}

class SpaceObject {
    int size
    SpaceObject(int size) { this.size = size }
}

@InheritConstructors class Asteroid extends SpaceObject {}
@InheritConstructors class Spaceship extends SpaceObject {}

==== Common Lisp ====
In a language with multiple dispatch, such as Common Lisp, it might look more like this (Common Lisp example shown):

(defclass asteroid ()  ((size :reader size :initarg :size)))
(defclass spaceship () ((size :reader size :initarg :size)))
(defun space-object (class size) (make-instance class :size size))

; collide-with is a generic function with multiple dispatch
(defmethod collide-with ((x asteroid)  (y asteroid))  "a/a")
(defmethod collide-with ((x asteroid)  (y spaceship)) "a/s")
(defmethod collide-with ((x spaceship) (y asteroid))  "s/a")
(defmethod collide-with ((x spaceship) (y spaceship)) "s/s")


(defun collide (x y)
  (if (and (> (size x) 100) (> (size y) 100))
      "big-boom"
      (collide-with x y)))

(print (collide (space-object 'asteroid 101)  (space-object 'spaceship 300)))
(print (collide (space-object 'asteroid 10)   (space-object 'spaceship 10)))
(print (collide (space-object 'spaceship 101) (space-object 'spaceship 10)))

and similarly for the other methods. Explicit testing and "dynamic casting" are not used.

In the presence of multiple dispatch, the traditional idea of methods as being defined in classes and contained in objects becomes less appealing—each collide-with method above is attached to two different classes, not one. Hence, the special syntax for method invocation generally disappears, so that method invocation looks exactly like ordinary function invocation, and methods are grouped not in classes but in generic functions.

==== Julia ====
Julia has built-in multiple dispatch, and it is central to the language design. The Julia version of the example above might look like:

abstract type SpaceObject end

struct Asteroid <: SpaceObject
    size::Int    
end
struct Spaceship <: SpaceObject
    size::Int                  
end

collide_with(::Asteroid, ::Spaceship) = "a/s"
collide_with(::Spaceship, ::Asteroid) = "s/a"
collide_with(::Spaceship, ::Spaceship) = "s/s"
collide_with(::Asteroid, ::Asteroid) = "a/a"

collide(x::SpaceObject, y::SpaceObject) = (x.size > 100 && y.size > 100) ? "Big boom!" : collide_with(x, y)

Output:

julia> collide(Asteroid(101), Spaceship(300))
"Big boom!"

julia> collide(Asteroid(10), Spaceship(10))
"a/s"

julia> collide(Spaceship(101), Spaceship(10))
"s/s"

==== Raku ====
Raku, like Perl, uses proven ideas from other languages, and type systems have shown themselves to offer compelling advantages in compiler-side code analysis and powerful user-side semantics via multiple dispatch.

It has both multimethods, and multisubs. Since most operators are subroutines, it also has multiple dispatched operators.

Along with the usual type constraints, it also has where constraints that allow making very specialized subroutines.

subset Mass of Real where 0 ^..^ Inf; 
role Stellar-Object {
    has Mass $.mass is required;
    method name () returns Str {...};
}
class Asteroid does Stellar-Object {
    method name () { 'an asteroid' }
}
class Spaceship does Stellar-Object {
    has Str $.name = 'some unnamed spaceship';
}
my Str @destroyed = < obliterated destroyed mangled >;
my Str @damaged = « damaged 'collided with' 'was damaged by' »;

# We add multi candidates to the numeric comparison operators because we are comparing them numerically,
# but makes no sense to have the objects coerce to a Numeric type.
# ( If they did coerce we wouldn't necessarily need to add these operators. )
# We could have also defined entirely new operators this same way.
multi sub infix:« <=> » ( Stellar-Object:D $a, Stellar-Object:D $b ) { $a.mass <=> $b.mass }
multi sub infix:« < » ( Stellar-Object:D $a, Stellar-Object:D $b ) { $a.mass < $b.mass }
multi sub infix:« > » ( Stellar-Object:D $a, Stellar-Object:D $b ) { $a.mass > $b.mass }
multi sub infix:« == » ( Stellar-Object:D $a, Stellar-Object:D $b ) { $a.mass == $b.mass }

# Define a new multi dispatcher, and add some type constraints to the parameters.
# If we didn't define it we would have gotten a generic one that didn't have constraints.
proto sub collide ( Stellar-Object:D $, Stellar-Object:D $ ) {*}

# No need to repeat the types here since they are the same as the prototype.
# The 'where' constraint technically only applies to $b not the whole signature.
# Note that the 'where' constraint uses the `<` operator candidate we added earlier.
multi sub collide ( $a, $b where $a < $b ) {
    say "$a.name() was @destroyed.pick() by $b.name()";
}
multi sub collide ( $a, $b where $a > $b ) {
    # redispatch to the previous candidate with the arguments swapped
    samewith $b, $a;
}

# This has to be after the first two because the other ones
# have 'where' constraints, which get checked in the
# order the subs were written. ( This one would always match. )
multi sub collide ( $a, $b ) {
    # randomize the order
    my ($n1, $n2) = ( $a.name, $b.name ).pick(*);
    say "$n1 @damaged.pick() $n2";
}

# The following two candidates can be anywhere after the proto,
# because they have more specialized types than the preceding three.

# If the ships have unequal mass one of the first two candidates gets called instead.
multi sub collide ( Spaceship $a, Spaceship $b where $a == $b ){
    my ($n1, $n2) = ( $a.name, $b.name ).pick(*);
    say "$n1 collided with $n2, and both ships were ",
    ( @destroyed.pick, 'left damaged' ).pick;
}

# You can unpack the attributes into variables within the signature.
# You could even have a constraint on them `(:mass($a) where 10)`.
multi sub collide ( Asteroid $ (:mass($a)), Asteroid $ (:mass($b)) ){
    say "two asteroids collided and combined into one larger asteroid of mass { $a + $b }";
}

my Spaceship $Enterprise .= new(:mass(1),:name('The Enterprise'));
collide Asteroid.new(:mass(.1)), $Enterprise;
collide $Enterprise, Spaceship.new(:mass(.1));
collide $Enterprise, Asteroid.new(:mass(1));
collide $Enterprise, Spaceship.new(:mass(1));
collide Asteroid.new(:mass(10)), Asteroid.new(:mass(5));

=== Extending languages with multiple-dispatch libraries ===
==== JavaScript ====
In languages that do not support multiple dispatch at the language definition or syntactic level, it is often possible to add multiple dispatch using a library extension. JavaScript and TypeScript do not support multimethods at the syntax level, but it is possible to add multiple dispatch via a library. For example, the multimethod package provides an implementation of multiple dispatch, generic functions.

Dynamically-typed version in JavaScript:

import { multi, method } from '@arrows/multimethod'

class Asteroid {}
class Spaceship {}

const collideWith = multi(
  method([Asteroid, Asteroid], (x, y) => {
    // deal with asteroid hitting asteroid
  }),
  method([Asteroid, Spaceship], (x, y) => {
    // deal with asteroid hitting spaceship
  }),
  method([Spaceship, Asteroid], (x, y) => {
    // deal with spaceship hitting asteroid
  }),
  method([Spaceship, Spaceship], (x, y) => {
    // deal with spaceship hitting spaceship
  }),
)

Statically-typed version in TypeScript:

import { multi, method, Multi } from '@arrows/multimethod'

class Asteroid {}
class Spaceship {}

type CollideWith = Multi & {
  (x: Asteroid, y: Asteroid): void
  (x: Asteroid, y: Spaceship): void
  (x: Spaceship, y: Asteroid): void
  (x: Spaceship, y: Spaceship): void
}

const collideWith: CollideWith = multi(
  method([Asteroid, Asteroid], (x, y) => {
    // deal with asteroid hitting asteroid
  }),
  method([Asteroid, Spaceship], (x, y) => {
    // deal with asteroid hitting spaceship
  }),
  method([Spaceship, Asteroid], (x, y) => {
    // deal with spaceship hitting asteroid
  }),
  method([Spaceship, Spaceship], (x, y) => {
    // deal with spaceship hitting spaceship
  }),
)

==== Python ====
Multiple dispatch can be added to Python using a library extension. For example, using the module multimethod.py and also with the module multimethods.py which provides CLOS-style multimethods for Python without changing the underlying syntax or keywords of the language.

from typing import Any

import game_behaviors
from game_objects import Asteroid, Spaceship
from multimethods import Dispatch

collide: Dispatch = Dispatch()
collide.add_rule((Asteroid, Spaceship), game_behaviors.as_func)
collide.add_rule((Spaceship, Spaceship), game_behaviors.ss_func)
collide.add_rule((Spaceship, Asteroid), game_behaviors.sa_func)

def aa_func(a: Any, b: Any) -> None:
    """Behavior when asteroid hits asteroid."""
    # ...define new behavior...

collide.add_rule((Asteroid, Asteroid), aa_func)

# ...later...
collide(thing1, thing2)

Functionally, this is very similar to the CLOS example, but the syntax is conventional Python.

Using decorators (introduced since Python 2.4), Guido van Rossum produced a sample implementation of multimethods with a simplified syntax:

@multimethod(Asteroid, Asteroid)
def collide(a: Asteroid, b: Asteroid) -> None:
    """Behavior when asteroid hits a asteroid."""
    # ...define new behavior...

@multimethod(Asteroid, Spaceship)
def collide(a: Asteroid, b: Spaceship) -> None:
    """Behavior when asteroid hits a spaceship."""
    # ...define new behavior...

# ... define other multimethod rules ...

and then it goes on to define the multimethod decorator.

The PEAK-Rules package provides multiple dispatch with a syntax similar to the above example. It was later replaced by PyProtocols.

The Reg library also supports multiple and predicate dispatch.

With the introduction of type hints, multiple dispatch is possible with even simpler syntax. For example, using plum-dispatch,

from plum import dispatch

@dispatch
def collide(a: Asteroid, b: Asteroid) -> None:
    """Behavior when asteroid hits a asteroid."""
    # ...define new behavior...
    
@dispatch
def collide(a: Asteroid, b: Spaceship) -> None:
    """Behavior when asteroid hits a spaceship."""
    # ...define new behavior...
    
# ...define further rules...

=== Emulating multiple dispatch ===
==== C ====
C does not have dynamic dispatch, so it must be implemented manually in some form. Often an enum is used to identify the subtype of an object. Dynamic dispatch can be done by looking up this value in a function pointer branch table. Here is a simple example in C:

typedef void (*CollisionCase)(void);

void collisionAsteroidAsteroid(void) {
    // handle Asteroid-Asteroid collision...
}

void collisionAsteroidSpaceship(void) {
    // handle Asteroid-Spaceship collision...
}

void collisionSpaceshipAsteroid(void) {
    // handle Spaceship-Asteroid collision...
}

void collisionSpaceshipSpaceship(void) {
    // handle Spaceship-Spaceship collision...
}

typedef enum {
    COLLIDEABLE_ASTEROID = 0,
    COLLIDEABLE_SPACESHIP,
    COLLIDEABLE_COUNT // not a type of Collideable itself, instead used to find number of space objects defined
} Collideable;

CollisionCase collisionCases[COLLIDEABLE_COUNT][COLLIDEABLE_COUNT] = {
    {&collisionAsteroidAsteroid, &collisionAsteroidSpaceship},
    {&collisionSpaceshipAsteroid, &collisionSpaceshipSpaceship}
};

void collide(Collideable a, Collideable b) {
    (*collisionCases[a][b])();
}

int main(void) {
    collide(COLLIDEABLE_SPACESHIP, COLLIDEABLE_ASTEROID);
}

With the C Object System library, C does support dynamic dispatch similar to CLOS. It is fully extensible and does not need any manual handling of the methods. Dynamic message (methods) are dispatched by the dispatcher of COS, which is faster than Objective-C. Here is an example in COS:

#include <stdio.h>
#include <cos/Object.h>
#include <cos/gen/object.h>

// classes

defclass (Asteroid)
    // data members
endclass

defclass (Spaceship)
    // data members
endclass

// generics

defgeneric (bool, collide_with, _1, _2);

// multimethods

defmethod (bool, collide_with, Asteroid, Asteroid)
    // deal with asteroid hitting asteroid
endmethod

defmethod (bool, collide_with, Asteroid, Spaceship)
    // deal with asteroid hitting spaceship
endmethod

defmethod (bool, collide_with, Spaceship, Asteroid)
    // deal with spaceship hitting asteroid
endmethod

defmethod (bool, collide_with, Spaceship, Spaceship)
    // deal with spaceship hitting spaceship
endmethod

// example of use

int main(void) {
    OBJ a = gnew(Asteroid);
    OBJ s = gnew(Spaceship);

    printf("<a,a> = %d\n", collide_with(a, a));
    printf("<a,s> = %d\n", collide_with(a, s));
    printf("<s,a> = %d\n", collide_with(s, a));
    printf("<s,s> = %d\n", collide_with(s, s));

    grelease(a);
    grelease(s);
}

==== C++ ====
As of 2021, C++ natively supports only single dispatch, though adding multi-methods (multiple dispatch) was proposed by Bjarne Stroustrup (and collaborators) in 2007. The methods of working around this limit are analogous: use either the visitor pattern, dynamic cast or a library:

// Example using run time type comparison via dynamic_cast

class Collideable {
public:
    virtual void collideWith(Collideable& other) = 0;
};

class Asteroid: public Collideable {
public:
    void collideWith(Collideable& other) {
        // dynamic_cast to a pointer type returns nullptr if the cast fails
        // (dynamic_cast to a reference type would throw an exception on failure)
        if (Asteroid* asteroid = dynamic_cast<Asteroid*>(&other)) {
            // handle Asteroid-Asteroid collision
        } else if (Spaceship* spaceship = dynamic_cast<Spaceship*>(&other)) {
            // handle Asteroid-Spaceship collision
        } else {
            // default collision handling here
        }
    }
};

class Spaceship: public Collideable {
public:
    void collideWith(Collideable& other) {
        if (Asteroid* asteroid = dynamic_cast<Asteroid*>(&other)) {
            // handle Spaceship-Asteroid collision
        } else if (Spaceship* spaceship = dynamic_cast<Spaceship*>(&other)) {
            // handle Spaceship-Spaceship collision
        } else {
            // default collision handling here
        }
    }
};

or pointer-to-method lookup table:

import std;

using std::unordered_map;

class Collideable {
protected:
    explicit Collideable(uint32_t cid): 
        tid{cid} {}

    virtual ~Collideable() = default;

    const uint32_t tid; // type id

    using CollisionHandler = void (Collideable::*)(Collideable& other);
    using CollisionHandlers = unordered_map<uint64_t, CollisionHandler>;

    static void addHandler(uint32_t id1, uint32_t id2, CollisionHandler handler) {
        collisionCases.insert(CollisionHandlers::value_type(key(id1, id2), handler));
    }

    static uint64_t key(uint32_t id1, uint32_t id2) {
        return uint64_t(id1) << 32 | id2;
    }

    static inline CollisionHandlers collisionCases{};
public:
    void collideWith(Collideable& other) {
        if (auto handler = collisionCases.find(key(tid, other.tid)); handler != collisionCases.end()) {
            (this->*handler->second)(other); // pointer-to-method call
        } else {
            // default collision handling
        }
    }
};

class Asteroid: public Collideable {
private:
    void asteroidCollision(Collideable& other) { 
        // handle Asteroid-Asteroid collision 
    }

    void spaceshipCollision(Collideable& other) { 
        // handle Asteroid-Spaceship collision
    }
public:
    Asteroid(): 
        Collideable(cid) {}

    ~Asteroid() = default;

    static void initCases();
    static inline const uint32_t cid = typeid(Asteroid).hash_code();
};

class Spaceship: public Collideable {
private:
    void asteroidCollision(Collideable& other) { 
        // handle Spaceship-Asteroid collision
    }

    void spaceshipCollision(Collideable& other) { 
        // handle Spaceship-Spaceship collision
    }
public:
    Spaceship(): 
        Collideable(cid) {}

    ~Spaceship() = default;

    static void initCases();
    static inline const uint32_t cid = typeid(Spaceship).hash_code(); // class id
};

void Asteroid::initCases() {
    addHandler(cid, cid, CollisionHandler(&Asteroid::asteroidCollision));
    addHandler(cid, Spaceship::cid, CollisionHandler(&Asteroid::spaceshipCollision));
}

void Spaceship::initCases() {
    addHandler(cid, Asteroid::cid, CollisionHandler(&Spaceship::asteroidCollision));
    addHandler(cid, cid, CollisionHandler(&Spaceship::spaceshipCollision));
}

int main(int argc, char* argv[]) {
    Asteroid::initCases();
    Spaceship::initCases();

    Asteroid a1; 
    Asteroid a2;
    Spaceship s1;
    Spaceship s2;

    a1.collideWith(a2);
    a1.collideWith(s1);

    s1.collideWith(s2);
    s1.collideWith(a1);
}

The YOMM2 library provides a fast, orthogonal implementation of open multimethods.

The syntax for declaring open methods is inspired by a proposal for a native C++ implementation. The library requires that the user registers all the classes used as virtual arguments (and their sub-classes), but does not require any modifications to existing code. Methods are implemented as ordinary inline C++ functions; they can be overloaded and they can be passed by pointer. There is no limit on the number of virtual arguments, and they can be arbitrarily mixed with non-virtual arguments.

The library uses a combination of techniques (compressed dispatch tables, collision free integer hash table) to implement method calls in constant time, while mitigating memory usage. Dispatching a call to an open method with a single virtual argument takes only 15–30% more time than calling an ordinary virtual member function, when a modern optimizing compiler is used.

The Asteroids example can be implemented as follows:

#include <yorel/yomm2/keywords.hpp>

import std;

using std::unique_ptr;

class Collideable {
public:
    virtual ~Collideable() = default;
};

class Asteroid : public Collideable {
    // ...
};

class Spaceship : public Collideable {
    // ...
};

register_classes(Collideable, Spaceship, Asteroid);

declare_method(void, collideWith, (virtual_<Collideable&>, virtual_<Collideable&>));

define_method(void, collideWith, (Collideable& left, Collideable& right)) {
    // default collision handling
}

define_method(void, collideWith, (Asteroid& left, Asteroid& right)) {
    // handle Asteroid-Asteroid collision
}

define_method(void, collideWith, (Asteroid& left, Spaceship& right)) {
    // handle Asteroid-Spaceship collision
}

define_method(void, collideWith, (Spaceship& left, Asteroid& right)) {
    // handle Spaceship-Asteroid collision
}

define_method(void, collideWith, (Spaceship& left, Spaceship& right)) {
    // handle Spaceship-Spaceship collision
}

int main(int argc, char* argv[]) {
    yorel::yomm2::update_methods();

    unique_ptr<Collideable> a1(std::make_unique<Asteroid>());
    unique_ptr<Collideable> a2(std::make_unique<Asteroid>());
    unique_ptr<Collideable> s1(std::make_unique<Spaceship>());
    unique_ptr<Collideable> s2(std::make_unique<Spaceship>());
    // note: types partially erased

    collideWith(*a1, *a2); // Asteroid-Asteroid collision
    collideWith(*a1, *s1); // Asteroid-Spaceship collision
    collideWith(*s1, *a1); // Spaceship-Asteroid collision
    collideWith(*s1, *s2); // Spaceship-Spaceship collision

    return 0;
}

Stroustrup mentions in The Design and Evolution of C++ that he liked the concept of multimethods and considered implementing it in C++ but claims to have been unable to find an efficient sample implementation (comparable to virtual functions) and resolve some possible type ambiguity problems. He then states that although the feature would still be nice to have, that it can be approximately implemented using double dispatch or a type based lookup table as outlined in the C/C++ example above so is a low priority feature for future language revisions.

==== D ====
As of 2021, as do many other object-oriented programming languages, D natively supports only single dispatch. However, it is possible to emulate open multimethods as a library function in D. The openmethods library is an example.

// Declaration
Matrix plus(virtual!Matrix, virtual!Matrix);

// The override for two DenseMatrix objects
@method
Matrix _plus(DenseMatrix a, DenseMatrix b)
{
  const int nr = a.rows;
  const int nc = a.cols;
  assert(a.nr == b.nr);
  assert(a.nc == b.nc);
  auto result = new DenseMatrix;
  result.nr = nr;
  result.nc = nc;
  result.elems.length = a.elems.length;
  result.elems[] = a.elems[] + b.elems[];
  return result;
}

// The override for two DiagonalMatrix objects
@method
Matrix _plus(DiagonalMatrix a, DiagonalMatrix b)
{
  assert(a.rows == b.rows);
  double[] sum;
  sum.length = a.elems.length;
  sum[] = a.elems[] + b.elems[];
  return new DiagonalMatrix(sum);
}

==== Java ====
In a language with only single dispatch, such as Java, multiple dispatch can be emulated with multiple levels of single dispatch:

interface Collideable {
    void collideWith(Collideable other);

    // These methods would need different names in a language without method overloading.
    void collideWith(Asteroid asteroid);
    void collideWith(Spaceship spaceship);
}

class Asteroid implements Collideable {
    public void collideWith(Collideable other) {
        // Call collideWith on the other object.
        other.collideWith(this);
   }

    public void collideWith(Asteroid asteroid) {
        // Handle Asteroid-Asteroid collision.
    }

    public void collideWith(Spaceship spaceship) {
        // Handle Asteroid-Spaceship collision.
    }
}

class Spaceship implements Collideable {
    public void collideWith(Collideable other) {
        // Call collideWith on the other object.
        other.collideWith(this);
    }

    public void collideWith(Asteroid asteroid) {
        // Handle Spaceship-Asteroid collision.
    }

    public void collideWith(Spaceship spaceship) {
        // Handle Spaceship-Spaceship collision.
    }
}

Run time instanceof checks at one or both levels can also be used.

== Support in programming languages ==
=== Primary paradigm ===
- Julia

=== Supporting general multimethods ===
- C# 4.0
- Cecil
- Clojure
- Common Lisp (via the Common Lisp Object System)
- Dylan
- Emacs Lisp (via cl-defmethod)
- Fortress
- Groovy
- Lasso
- Nim, up to v0.19.x (from v0.20.0 it is necessary to pass a compiler flag)
- Raku
- R
- TADS
- Visual Basic (.NET) (VB.NET) via late binding, also via .Net DLR
- Wolfram Language via symbolic pattern matching
- Xtend

=== Via extensions ===
- Any .NET framework language (via the library MultiMethods.NET)
- C (via the library C Object System)
- C# (via the library multimethod-sharp)
- C++ (via the library yomm2, multimethods and omm)
- D (via the library openmethods)
- Factor (via the standard multimethods vocabulary)
- Java (using the extension MultiJava)
- JavaScript (via package @arrows/multimethod)
- Perl (via the module Class::Multimethods)
- Python (via PEAK-Rules, RuleDispatch, gnosis.magic.multimethods, PyMultimethods, multipledispatch, or plum-dispatch)
- Racket (via multimethod-lib)
- Ruby (via the library The Multiple Dispatch Library and Multimethod Package and Vlx-Multimethods Package)
- Scheme (via e.g. TinyCLOS)
- TypeScript (via package @arrows/multimethod)

== See also ==
- Predicate dispatch
