= Predicate dispatch =

Technique in computer programming

In computer programming, predicate dispatch is a generalisation of multiple dispatch ("multimethods") that allows the method to call to be selected at runtime based on arbitrary decidable logical predicates and/or pattern matching attached to a method declaration.

Raku supports predicate dispatch using "where" clauses that can execute arbitrary code against any function or method parameter.

Julia has a package for it with PatternDispatch.jl but otherwise natively supports multiple dispatch.

Experimental implementations have been created for Common LISP, and for Java (JPred).

It allows open extension of previously declared methods at a fine-grained level, but multiple extensions with identical or overlapping predicates created by different developers may interfere with each other in unanticipated ways. In this respect it is similar to aspect-oriented programming.
