= Scriptol =

Scriptol is an object-oriented programming language that allows users to declare an XML document as a class. The language is universal and allows users to create dynamic web pages, as well as create scripts and binary applications.
