= Dynamic Invocation Interface =

The Dynamic Invocation Interface (DII) is a CORBA API that allows clients to construct and invoke object requests dynamically at runtime, without requiring compile-time knowledge of the target interface. Using DII, a client specifies the operation name, builds and marshals the argument list, and sends a request to the object via the ORB.

DII supports several invocation modes, including synchronous and deferred synchronous invocation. It is particularly useful for applications such as CORBA service browsers, protocol bridges, systems interacting with many different interfaces, and monitoring tools.

In deferred synchronous invocation, a request is sent without blocking for a response. Unlike one-way operations, return values and out parameters are available, but the client must explicitly poll for completion and retrieve the results.
