= Oak (programming language) =

Discontinued programming language

Oak is a discontinued programming language created by James Gosling in 1989, initially for Sun Microsystems' set-top box project. The language later evolved to become Java.

== History ==
Duke, Oak's smartagent that would later become the Java mascot

In 1985, Sun Microsystems was attempting to develop a new technology for programming next generation smart appliances, which Sun expected to be a major new opportunity.

The team originally considered using C++, but rejected the idea for several reasons (see Java history).

Initially, Gosling attempted to modify and extend C++ but soon abandoned that in favor of creating a new platform called Green and an entirely new language, which he called Oak, after the oak tree that stood just outside his office.

By the summer of 1992, they were able to demonstrate portions of the new platform including the Green OS, the Oak language, the libraries, and the hardware. Their first attempt, demonstrated on September 3, 1992, focused on building a PDA device named Star7 which had a graphical interface and a smart agent called "Duke" to assist the user.

Oak was renamed Java in 1994 after a trademark search revealed that Oak was used by Oak Technology. Java 1.0 was finally shipped in 1996.

== Differences with Java ==
Oak was the basis for what Java 1.0 became later, but there were also some differences: Several concepts were planned in the Oak specification but were not implemented in the original language because of time constraints:

- Unsigned primitive types turned out never to be implemented in Java.
- The enum keyword for enumerated types was implemented in Java for Java 5.0.
- The assert keyword was implemented in Java for Java 1.4

Other concepts were different from, or improved later, for Java:

- Abstract methods were defined as in C++.
- While the Oak default access level was the same as Java's (default) package private access level, it was called "private". Oak did not have an equivalent to Java's private access modifier.

And finally some concepts were later scraped out:

- All exceptions were unchecked.
- It was possible by the unprotect keyword to write code that would not signal asynchronous exceptions.
- There was some support for Design by Contract: Oak had assertions whereby Class variable could be constrained and the constraints were enforced at entry and exit of every public and protected method of the class. Methods could also have their own pre-conditions and post-conditions, which were inherited but not redefinable in a subclass.

== See also ==
- Java (programming language)
- Java version history
