= Mount Nagrik Sahakari Bank =

Bank in northern India

Mount Nagrik Sahakari Bank Ltd.
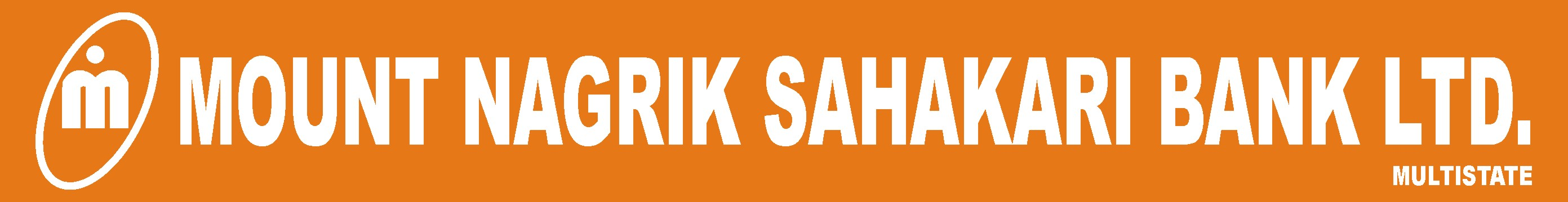
- Type: Co-operative bank
- Industry: Banking; Financial services
- Founded: 1972
- Headquarters: Sirohi, Rajasthan, India
- Key people: Narendra Singh Dabi (MD & CEO)
- Products: Deposits; Savings; Loans
- Number of employees: 350
- Website: mount.bank.in

Mount Nagrik Sahakari Bank Ltd. is a multi-state co-operative bank with 49 branches across states of Rajasthan and Gujarat that has been in operation since 1972.

== History ==
Established on 5 September 1972 as Sirohi District Commercial Co-operative Bank Limited; was set up with an objective to promote financial cooperation among low income group members of society and to encourage savings for creating funds to aid the deserving members. It was in line with the government’s focus on raising the living standards and earning capacity of farmers and laborers. The bank was registered under provisions of Rajasthan Co-operative Society Act, 1965. Initially, it was able to mobilize 52 members and a capital of Rs. 51,700 and banking business started from 18 October 1972.

Bank was functioning in both rural as well as urban areas since its inception in 1972, which continued until 1986. The banking business continued in Sirohi district with 4 branches, but thereafter, new branches were opened to cater larger area and customers. Initially in the adjoining districts of Jalore, Pali, Udaipur later in Jaipur and Ajmer districts of Rajasthan. By March 2009, the number of branches of bank reached 25.Within this period bank created benchmarks for others to follow by setting standards in terms of exemplary customer service and in terms of having a vast base of highly satisfied customers, both in rural as well as in urban areas.

Going beyond the boundaries of Sirohi district in Rajasthan and expanding network of branches in Gujarat too, bank earned the distinction by becoming the first bank in the state to get registered under the Multi State Cooperative Societies Act 2002. In 2009, Sri Deesa Nagrik Sahakari Bank Ltd of Deesa, Gujarat and Surendranagar Mercantile Co-operative Bank of Surendranagar District of Gujarat was merged, Resulting; change in its name from Madhav Nagrik Sahakari Bank Limited to Adarsh Co-operative Bank Ltd and now present name Mount Nagrik Sahakari Bank Limited. Mount Nagrik Sahakari Bank increasing its area of operations and customer base.

As on date all the 49 branches stand computerized and the bank holds the honor of being one of the first computerized banks. The bank has also achieved highest growth rate amongst the cooperative banks in Northern India.

== Awards and recognition ==
- "Best performing Co-operative Bank award" in 2008-2009 by Indian Achievers Forum, secured First position in the state of Rajasthan and ninth position on All India Basis.
- "Excellence in Customer Service Award" at The Banking Frontiers in Co-opative Banking Awards 2010 held by Banking Frontiers on 23 December 2010 at Goa.

== See also ==
- Co-operative banking
