= Cecil (programming language) =

Object-oriented programming language

- Paradigm: object-oriented
- Designed by: Craig Chambers
- First appeared: 1992; 33 years ago
- Typing discipline: dynamic (optionally static)

Influenced
- Diesel

Cecil is a pure object-oriented programming language that was developed by Craig Chambers at the University of Washington in 1992 to be part of the Vortex project there. Cecil has many similarities to other object-oriented languages, most notably Objective-C, Modula-3, and Self. The main goals of the project were extensibility, orthogonality, efficiency, and ease-of-use.

The language supports multiple dispatch and multimethods, dynamic inheritance, and optional static type checking. Unlike most other OOP systems, Cecil allows subtyping and code inheritance to be used separately, allowing run-time or external extension of object classes or instances. Like Objective-C, all object services in Cecil are invoked by message passing, and the language supports run-time class identification. These features allow Cecil to support dynamic, exploratory programming styles. Parameterized types and methods (generics, polymorphism), garbage collection, and delegation are also supported. Cecil also supports a module mechanism for isolating independent libraries or packages. Cecil does not presently support threads or any other form of concurrency. A standard library for Cecil is also available and includes various collection, utility, system, I/O, and GUI classes.

The Diesel language was the successor of Cecil.
