= Noop =

Experimental programming language

- Designed by: Alex Eagle, Christian Gruber
- First appeared: 2009; 17 years ago
- Typing discipline: static
- License: Apache License 2.0
- Website: code.google.com/p/noop

Noop (/ˈnoʊ.ɒp/, like no-op) was a project by Google engineers Alex Eagle and Christian Gruber aiming to develop a new programming language. Noop attempted to blend the best features of "old" and "new" languages, while syntactically encouraging well accepted programming best-practices. Noop was initially targeted to run on the Java Virtual Machine.

Noop progressed past its initial proposals into a limited interpreter, but according to posts by the project owners in 2010 and 2013, they no longer intended to pursue the language any further. Among the reasons cited for discontinuing work on the language was the initial release of Kotlin, which achieves many of the language goals of Noop. The Noop language can be executed as an interpreted language, as a compiled language, or as Java code.

== Creation ==
The Noop language was created by Google. It was presented during the 2009 edition of the JVM Language Summit held in Santa Clara, California from September 16 to 18, 2009.

== Examples ==
Hello world in Noop

import noop.Application;
import noop.Console;

class HelloWorld(Console console) implements Application {

  Int main(List args) {
    String s = "Hello World!";

    console.println(s);
    return 0;
  }
}
