= Actor-Based Concurrent Language =

Family of programming languages

Actor-Based Concurrent Language (ABCL) is a family of programming languages, developed in Japan in the 1980s and 1990s.

== ABCL/1 ==
ABCL/1 (Actor-Based Concurrent Language) is a prototype-based concurrent computing language for the ABCL MIMD system, created in 1986 by Akinori Yonezawa, of the Department of Information Science at the University of Tokyo.

ABCL/1 uses asynchronous message passing among objects to achieve concurrency. It requires Common Lisp. Implementations in Kyoto Common Lisp (KCL) and Symbolics Lisp are available from the author.

=== ABCL/c+ ===
An implementation of ABCL/c+ is available from the ACM.

=== ABCL/R ===
ABCL/R is an object-oriented reflective programming (reflective) subset of ABCL/1, written by Professor Akinori Yonezawa of Tokyo Institute of Technology in 1988.

==== ABCL/R2 ====
ABCL/R2 is a second generation version of ABCL/R, designed for the Hybrid Group Architecture. It was produced at the Tokyo Institute of Technology in 1992, and has almost all the functions of ABCL/1. It is written in Common Lisp. As a reflective language, its programs can dynamically control their behavior, including scheduling policy, from within a user-process context.
