= Generics in Java =

Features of the Java programming language

Generics are a facility of generic programming that were added to the Java programming language in 2004 within version J2SE 5.0. They were designed to extend Java's type system to allow "a type or method to operate on objects of various types while providing compile-time type safety". The aspect compile-time type safety required that parametrically polymorphic functions are not implemented in the Java virtual machine, since type safety is impossible in this case.

The Java collections framework supports generics to specify the type of objects stored in a collection instance.

In 1998, Gilad Bracha, Martin Odersky, David Stoutamire and Philip Wadler created Generic Java, an extension to the Java language to support generic types. Generic Java was incorporated in Java with the addition of wildcards.

== Hierarchy and classification ==
According to Java Language Specification:

- A type variable is an unqualified identifier. Type variables are introduced by generic class declarations, generic interface declarations, generic method declarations, and by generic constructor declarations. These are often a single capital letter, but those longer than one letter are typically written in ALL_CAPS (unlike other languages like C++, C#, and Rust where they are PascalCase), for instance java.util.PrimitiveIterator<T, T_CONS>.
- A class is generic if it declares one or more type variables. It defines one or more type variables that act as parameters. A generic class declaration defines a set of parameterized types, one for each possible invocation of the type parameter section. All of these parameterized types share the same class at runtime.
- An interface is generic if it declares one or more type variables. It defines one or more type variables that act as parameters. A generic interface declaration defines a set of types, one for each possible invocation of the type parameter section. All parameterized types share the same interface at runtime.
- A method is generic if it declares one or more type variables. These type variables are known as the formal type parameters of the method. The form of the formal type parameter list is identical to a type parameter list of a class or interface.
- A constructor can be declared as generic, independently of whether the class that the constructor is declared in is itself generic. A constructor is generic if it declares one or more type variables. These type variables are known as the formal type parameters of the constructor. The form of the formal type parameter list is identical to a type parameter list of a generic class or interface.

== Motivation ==
The following block of Java code illustrates a problem that exists when not using generics. First, it declares an java.util.ArrayList of type java.lang.Object. Then, it adds a java.lang.String to the java.util.ArrayList. Finally, it attempts to retrieve the added java.lang.String and cast it to an java.lang.Integer—an error in logic, as it is impossible to cast any string instance to an integer.

import java.util.ArrayList;
import java.util.List;

List v = new ArrayList();
v.add("test"); // A String that cannot be cast to an Integer
Integer i = (Integer)v.get(0); // Run time error

This is similar to C, which lacks generics, and its collection-like data structures typically store data as void* (a void pointer), from which objects must be cast explicitly.

Although the code is compiled without error, it throws a runtime exception (java.lang.ClassCastException) when executing the third line of code. This type of logic error can be detected during compile time by using generics and is the primary motivation for using them. It defines one or more type variables that act as parameters.

The above code fragment can be rewritten using generics as follows:

import java.util.ArrayList;
import java.util.List;

List<String> v = new ArrayList<String>();
v.add("test");
Integer i = (Integer)v.get(0); // (type error) compilation-time error

The type parameter java.lang.String within the angle brackets declares the java.util.ArrayList to be constituted of java.lang.String (a descendant of the java.util.ArrayList's generic java.lang.Object constituents). With generics, it is no longer necessary to cast the third line to any particular type, because the result of v.get(0) is defined as java.lang.String by the code generated by the compiler.

The logical flaw in the third line of this fragment will be detected as a compile-time error (with J2SE 5.0 or later) because the compiler will detect that v.get(0) returns java.lang.String instead of java.lang.Integer. For a more elaborate example, see reference.

Here is a small excerpt from the definition of the interfaces java.util.List and java.util.Iterator in package java.util:

interface List<E> {
    void add(E x);
    Iterator<E> iterator();
}

interface Iterator<E> {
    E next();
    boolean hasNext();
}

== Generic class definitions ==
Here is an example of a generic Java class, which can be used to represent individual entries (key to value mappings) in a map:

public class Entry<K, V> {
    private K key;
    private V value;

    public Entry(K key, V value) {  
        this.key = key;
        this.value = value;
    }

    public K getKey() {
        return key;
    }

    public V getValue() {
        return value;
    }

    public String toString() { 
        return String.format("(%s, %s)", key, value);
    }
}

This generic class could be used in the following ways, for example:

Entry<String, String> grade = new Entry<String, String>("Mike", "A");
Entry<String, Integer> mark = new Entry<String, Integer>("Mike", 100);
System.out.printf("grade: %s%n", grade);
System.out.printf("mark: %s%n", mark);

Entry<Integer, Boolean> prime = new Entry<>(13, true);
if (prime.getValue()) {
    System.out.println("%s is prime.%n", prime.getKey());
} else {
    System.out.println("%s is not prime.%n", prime.getKey());
}

It outputs:

grade: (Mike, A)
mark: (Mike, 100)
13 is prime.

== Generic method definitions ==
Here is an example of a generic method using the generic class above, for a generic type T:

public static <T> Entry<T, T> twice(T value) {
    return new Entry<T, T>(value, value);
}

In many cases, the user of the method need not indicate the type parameters, as they can be inferred:

Entry<String, String> pair = Entry.twice("Hello");

The parameters can be explicitly added if needed:

Entry<String, String> pair = Entry.<String>twice("Hello");

The use of primitive types is not allowed, and boxed versions must be used instead; only reference types may be stored in a generic type parameter. For instance, Entry<int, int> pair; fails compiling, and should instead be using the wrapper classes for primitives (like Entry<Integer, Integer> pair;.

There is also the possibility to create generic methods based on given parameters.

public <T> T[] toArray(T... elements) {
    return elements;
}

In such cases one cannot use primitive types either, e.g.:

Integer[] array = toArray(1, 2, 3, 4, 5, 6);

While primitives cannot be stored, arrays of primitives (as they are objects, not primitives themselves) can:

import java.util.ArrayList;
import java.util.List;

// List<int[]> and List<Integer[]> are equally acceptable
List<int[]> listOfArrays = new ArrayList<>();
List<Integer[]> myOtherList = listOfArrays;

== Diamond operator ==
Using type inference, Java SE 7 and above allow the programmer to substitute an empty pair of angle brackets (<>, called the "diamond operator") for a pair of angle brackets containing the one or more type parameters that a sufficiently close context implies. While <> is often called the "diamond operator", it is not an operator, just an empty type parameter list.

Thus, the above code example using Entry can be rewritten as:

Entry<String, String> grade = new Entry<>("Mike", "A");
Entry<String, Integer> mark = new Entry<>("Mike", 100);

System.out.printf("grade: %s%n", grade);
System.out.printf("mark: %s%n", mark);

Entry<Integer, Boolean> prime = new Entry<>(13, true);
if (prime.getValue()) {
    System.out.println("%s is prime.%n", prime.getKey());
} else {
    System.out.println("%s is not prime.%n", prime.getKey());
}

The so-called "diamond operator" does not exist in other Java-derived languages like C# or Kotlin, which have their own ways to avoid redundant type information. While something visually similar exists in C++, it does not denote type parameter deduction, but rather refers to only the default type parameter.

template <typename T = int>
class Box {
    // ...
};

Box<> v; // refers to Box<int>

== Type wildcards ==
A type argument for a parameterized type is not limited to a concrete class or interface. Java allows the use of "type wildcards" to serve as type arguments for parameterized types. Wildcards are type arguments in the form "<?>"; optionally with an upper or lower bound. Given that the exact type represented by a wildcard is unknown, restrictions are placed on the type of methods that may be called on an object that uses parameterized types.

Here is an example where the element type of a java.util.Collection<E> is parameterized by a wildcard:

import java.util.ArrayList;
import java.util.Collection;

Collection<?> c = new ArrayList<String>();
c.add(new Object()); // compile-time error
c.add(null); // allowed

Since the element type of c is not known, objects cannot be added to it. The add() method takes arguments of type E, the element type of the java.util.Collection<E> generic interface. When the actual type argument is ?, it stands for some unknown type. Any method argument value passed to the add() method would have to be a subtype of this unknown type. Since we don't know what type that is, we cannot pass anything in. The sole exception is null; which is a member of every type.

To specify the upper bound of a type wildcard, the extends keyword is used to indicate that the type argument is a subtype of the bounding class. So List<? extends Number> means that the given list contains objects of some unknown type which extends the java.lang.Number class. For example, the list could be List<Float> or List<Number>. Reading an element from the list will return a java.lang.Number. Adding null elements is, again, also allowed.

The use of wildcards above adds flexibility since there is not any inheritance relationship between any two parameterized types with concrete type as type argument. Neither List<Number> nor List<Integer> is a subtype of the other; even though java.lang.Integer is a subtype of java.lang.Number. So, any method that takes List<Number> as a parameter does not accept an argument of List<Integer>. If it did, it would be possible to insert a java.lang.Number that is not an java.lang.Integer into it; which violates type safety. Here is an example that demonstrates how type safety would be violated if List<Integer> were a subtype of List<Number>:

import java.util.ArrayList;
import java.util.List;

List<Integer> intList = new ArrayList<>();
intList.add(2);
List<Number> nums = intList; // valid if List<Integer> were a subtype of List<Number> according to substitution rule. 
nums.add(3.14);  
Integer x = intList.get(1); // now 3.14 is assigned to an Integer variable!

The solution with wildcards works because it disallows operations that would violate type safety:

import java.util.List;

List<? extends Number> nums = ints; // OK
nums.add(3.14); // compile-time error
nums.add(null); // allowed

To specify the lower bounding class of a type wildcard, the super keyword is used. This keyword indicates that the type argument is a supertype of the bounding class. So, List<? super Number> could represent List<Number> or List<Object>. Reading from a list defined as List<? super Number> returns elements of type java.lang.Object. Adding to such a list requires either elements of type java.lang.Number, any subtype of java.lang.Number or null (which itself is typeless, and can be assigned to any type).

The mnemonic PECS (Producer Extends, Consumer Super) from the book Effective Java by Joshua Bloch gives an easy way to remember when to use wildcards (corresponding to covariance and contravariance) in Java.

== Generics in throws clause ==
Although exceptions themselves cannot be generic, type parameters can appear in a throws clause:

public <T extends Throwable> void throwMeConditional(boolean conditional, T exception) throws T {
    if (conditional) {
        throw exception;
    }
}

In this case, it is possible as the type parameter is bounded below by java.lang.Throwable, guaranteeing that T may appear in the throws clause.

The following pattern, sometimes known as the generic rethrow or sneaky throw, is used to bypass checked exceptions entirely, such as in the Project Lombok @SneakyThrows attribute.

static <T extends Throwable> void sneakyThrow(Throwable t) throws T {
    throw (T) t;
}

== Problems with type erasure ==
Generics are checked at compile-time for type-correctness. The generic type information is then removed in a process called type erasure. For example, List<Integer> will be converted to the non-generic type java.util.List, which ordinarily contains arbitrary objects. The compile-time check guarantees that the resulting code uses the correct type.

Because of type erasure, type parameters cannot be determined at run-time. For example, when an java.util.ArrayList is examined at runtime, there is no general way to determine whether, before type erasure, it was an ArrayList<Integer> or an ArrayList<Float>. Many people are dissatisfied with this restriction. There are partial approaches. For example, individual elements may be examined to determine the type they belong to; for example, if an java.util.ArrayList<E> contains a java.lang.Integer, that java.util.ArrayList<E> may have been parameterized with java.lang.Integer (however, it may have been parameterized with any parent of java.lang.Integer, such as java.lang.Number or java.lang.Object).

Demonstrating this point, the following code outputs "Equal":

import java.util.ArrayList;
import java.util.List;

List<Integer> li = new ArrayList<>();
List<Float> lf = new ArrayList<>();
if (li.getClass() == lf.getClass()) { // evaluates to true
    System.out.println("Equal");
}

Another effect of type erasure is that a generic class cannot extend the java.lang.Throwable class in any way, directly or indirectly:

// causes a compile error
public class GenericException<T> extends Exception {
    // ...
}

The reason why this is not supported is due to type erasure:

try {
    throw new GenericException<Integer>();
} catch (GenericException<Integer> e) {
    System.err.println("Integer");
} catch (GenericException<String> e) {
    System.err.println("String");
}

Due to type erasure, the runtime will not know which catch block to execute, so this is prohibited by the compiler.

Java generics differ from C++ templates. Java generics generate only one compiled version of a generic class or function regardless of the number of parameterizing types used. Furthermore, the Java run-time environment does not need to know which parameterized type is used because the type information is validated at compile-time and is not included in the compiled code. Consequently, instantiating a Java class of a parameterized type is impossible because instantiation requires a call to a constructor, which is unavailable if the type is unknown.

For example, the following code cannot be compiled:

import java.util.List;

<T> T instantiateElementType(List<T> arg) {
     return new T(); // causes a compile error
}

Because there is only one copy per generic class at runtime, static variables are shared among all the instances of the class, regardless of their type parameter. Consequently, the type parameter cannot be used in the declaration of static variables or in static methods.

Type erasure was implemented in Java to maintain backward compatibility with programs written prior to Java SE5.

== Differences from Arrays ==
There are several important differences between arrays (both primitive arrays and java.lang.Object arrays), and generics in Java. Two of the major differences, namely, differences in terms of variance and reification.

=== Covariance, contravariance and invariance ===
Generics are invariant, whereas arrays are covariant. This is a benefit of using generic when compared to non-generic objects such as arrays. Specifically, generics can help prevent run time exceptions by throwing a compile-time exception to force the developer to fix the code.

For example, if a developer declares an java.lang.Object[] object and instantiates the object as a new java.lang.Long[] object, no compile-time exception is thrown (since arrays are covariant). This may give the false impression that the code is correctly written. However, if the developer attempts to add a java.lang.String to this java.lang.Long[] object, the program will throw a java.lang.ArrayStoreException. This run-time exception can be completely avoided if the developer uses generics.

If the developer declares a Collection<Object> object and creates a new instance of this object with return type ArrayList<Long>, the Java compiler will (correctly) throw a compile-time exception to indicate the presence of incompatible types (since generics are invariant). Hence, this avoids potential run-time exceptions. This problem can be fixed by creating an instance of Collection<Object> using ArrayList<Object> object instead. For code using Java SE7 or later versions, the Collection<Object> can be instantiated with an ArrayList<> object using the diamond operator.

=== Reification ===
Arrays are reified, meaning that an array object enforces its type information at run-time, whereas generics in Java are not reified. This is because arrays are real compiler-generated classes in the JVM; for each type T, there exists a type T[].

More formally speaking, objects with generic type in Java are non-reifiable types. A non-reifiable type is type whose representation at run-time has less information than its representation at compile-time.

Objects with generic type in Java are non-reifiable due to type erasure. Java only enforces type information at compile-time. After the type information is verified at compile-time, the type information is discarded, and at run-time, the type information will not be available.

Examples of non-reifiable types include List<T> and List<String>, where T is a generic formal parameter.

== Project on generics ==
Project Valhalla is an experimental project to incubate improved Java generics and language features, for future versions potentially from Java 10 onwards. Potential enhancements include:

- generic specialization, e.g. List<int> rather than List<Integer>
- reified generics; making actual types available at runtime.

== See also ==
- Generic programming
- Template metaprogramming
- Wildcard (Java)
- Template (C++)
- Comparison of C# and Java
- Comparison of Java and C++
