= Barton–Nackman trick =

Term for an idiom in the C++ language

Barton–Nackman trick is a term coined by the C++ standardization committee (ISO/IEC JTC1/SC22 WG21) to refer to an idiom introduced by John Barton and Lee Nackman as restricted template expansion.

== The idiom ==
The idiom is characterized by an in-class friend function definition appearing in the base class template component of the curiously recurring template pattern (CRTP).

// An interface-like template to express an equality comparison interface.
template <typename T> 
class EqualityComparable {
protected:
    EqualityComparable() = default;

    friend bool operator==(const T& a, const T& b) { 
        return a.equalTo(b); 
    }

    friend bool operator!=(const T& a, const T& b) { 
        return !a.equalTo(b); 
    }
};

// Class Foo needs == and !=, so it implements EqualityComparable
// with itself as the template parameter
class Foo : public EqualityComparable<Foo> {
public:
    bool equalTo(const Foo& rhs) const; // to be defined
};

When a class template like EqualityComparable<T> is instantiated, the in-class friend definitions produce nontemplate (and nonmember) functions (operator functions, in this case). At the time the idiom was introduced (1994), the C++ language did not define a partial ordering for overloaded function templates and, as a result, overloading function templates often resulted in ambiguities. For example, trying to capture a generic definition for operator== as

template <typename T>
bool operator==(const T& a, const T& b) {
    // ...
}

would essentially be incompatible with another definition like

template <typename T>
bool operator==(const Bar<T>& a, const Bar<T>& b) {
    // ...
}

The Barton–Nackman trick, then, achieves the goal of providing a generic user-defined equality operator without having to deal with such ambiguities. The adjective restricted in the idiom name refers to the fact that the provided in-class function definition is restricted (only applies) to specializations of the given class template.

The term is sometimes mistakenly used to refer to the curiously recurring template pattern (CRTP). As explained above, the Barton–Nackman trick is, instead, a distinct idiom (that relies on the CRTP).

== How it works ==
When the compiler encounters the expression v1 == v2, where v1 and v2 are of type Foo, it attempts argument-dependent lookup (ADL) for operator==. This lookup includes consideration of friend functions declared in Foo and its base classes. (Note that if Foo were an incomplete template instance, ADL would trigger its complete instantiation.)

The Barton–Nackman trick originally relied not on ADL but on a C++ feature called "friend name injection", in which an in-class declaration of a friend function made the function name visible in the immediately surrounding namespace scope (possibly the global scope). When investigating the possibility of removing friend name injection from the C++ programming language, Barton and Nackman's idiom was found to be the only reasonable use of that language rule. Eventually, the rules for argument-dependent lookup were adjusted to replace friend name injection by a less drastic mechanism, described above, that maintained the validity of Barton and Nackman's technique. As a consequence of this change, the expression ::operator==(v1, v2) is no longer valid, because qualified names aren't subject to ADL and friend declarations aren't found via ordinary lookup. Note, too, that the friend specifier is essential, even if the defined friend functions do not actually need to access nonpublic members of the befriending class.

== See also ==
- Template (C++)
- Template metaprogramming
- Concepts (C++)
