= Curiously recurring template pattern =

Software design pattern

The curiously recurring template pattern (CRTP) is an idiom in which a class derives from a class template instantiation using itself as a template parameter. More generally it is known as $F$-bound polymorphism, and it is a form of F-bounded quantification.

== History ==
The technique was formalized in 1989 as "$F$-bounded quantification." The name "CRTP" was independently coined by Jim Coplien in 1995, who had observed it in some of the earliest C++ template code as well as in code examples that Timothy Budd created in his multiparadigm language Leda. It is sometimes called "Upside-Down Inheritance" due to the way it allows class hierarchies to be extended by substituting different base classes.

The Microsoft Implementation of CRTP in Active Template Library (ATL) was independently discovered, also in 1995, by Jan Falkin, who accidentally derived a base class from a derived class. Christian Beaumont first saw Falkin's code and initially thought it could not compile in the Microsoft compiler available at the time. Following the revelation that it did work, Beaumont based the entire ATL and Windows Template Library (WTL) design on this mistake.

== General form ==
// The Curiously Recurring Template Pattern (CRTP)
template <typename T>
class Base {
    // methods within Base can use template to access members of Derived
};

class Derived : public Base<Derived> {
    // ...
};

One use case for this pattern is static polymorphism. It also figures prominently in the C++ implementation of the Data, Context, and Interaction paradigm. In addition, CRTP is used by the C++ standard library to implement the std::enable_shared_from_this functionality.

In Java and C#, CRTP can be done using recursive generics, with the base class being a generic parameter inheriting from itself:

abstract class Component<T extends Component<T>> {
    public T setVisible(boolean visible) {
        // ...
        return (T)this;
    }
}

class Button extends Component<Button> {
    public void click() {
        // ...
    }
}

For example, java.lang.Enum<E>, a class which all enums inherit from, has the signature public abstract class Enum<E extends Enum<E>> extends Object implements Constable, Comparable<E>, Serializable.

Rust, however, due to not using inheritance, avoids CRTP entirely, and achieves its results using the Self keyword.

trait Cloneable {
    fn duplicate(&self) -> Self;
}

struct X {
    // ...
}

impl Cloneable for X {
    fn duplicate(&self) -> Self {
        X { /* cloning logic */ }
    }
}

== Static polymorphism ==
Typically, the base class template will take advantage of the fact that member function bodies (definitions) are not instantiated until long after their declarations, and will use members of the derived class within its own member functions, via the use of a cast; e.g.:

template <typename T> 
struct Base {
    void call() {
        // ...
        static_cast<T*>(this)->implementation();
        // ...
    }

    static void staticFunc() {
        // ...
        T::staticSubFunc();
        // ...
    }
};

struct Derived : public Base<Derived> {
    void implementation() {
        // ...
    }

    static void staticSubFunc() {
        // ...
    }
};

In the above example, the function Base<Derived>::call(), though declared before the existence of the struct Derived is known by the compiler (i.e., before Derived is declared), is not actually instantiated by the compiler until it is actually called by some later code which occurs after the declaration of Derived (not shown in the above example), so that at the time the function call is instantiated, the declaration of Derived::implementation() is known.

This technique achieves a similar effect to the use of virtual functions, without the costs (and some flexibility) of dynamic polymorphism. This particular use of the CRTP has been called "simulated dynamic binding" by some. This pattern is used extensively in the Windows ATL and WTL libraries.

To elaborate on the above example, consider a base class with no virtual functions. Whenever the base class calls another member function, it will always call its own base class functions. When we derive a class from this base class, we inherit all the member variables and member functions that were not overridden (no constructors or destructors). If the derived class calls an inherited function which then calls another member function, then that function will never call any derived or overridden member functions in the derived class.

However, if base class member functions use CRTP for all member function calls, the overridden functions in the derived class will be selected at compile time. This effectively emulates the virtual function call system at compile time without the costs in size or function call overhead (VTBL structures, and method lookups, multiple-inheritance VTBL machinery) at the disadvantage of not being able to make this choice at runtime.

== Object counter ==
The main purpose of an object counter is retrieving statistics of object creation and destruction for a given class. This can be easily solved using CRTP:

template <typename T>
class Counter {
protected:
    static inline int objectsCreated = 0;
    static inline int objectsAlive = 0;

    // objects should never be removed through pointers of this type
    ~Counter() {
        --objectsAlive;
    }
public:
    Counter() {
        ++objectsCreated;
        ++objectsAlive;
    }
    
    Counter([[maybe_unused]] const Counter& x) {
        ++objectsCreated;
        ++objectsAlive;
    }
};

class X : public Counter<X> {
    // ...
};

class Y : public Counter<Y> {
    // ...
};

Each time an object of class X is created, the constructor of Counter<X> is called, incrementing both the created and alive count. Each time an object of class X is destroyed, the alive count is decremented. Counter<X> and Counter<Y> are two separate classes and this is why they will keep separate counts of Xs and Ys. In this example of CRTP, this distinction of classes is the only use of the template parameter (T in Counter<T>) and the reason why we cannot use a simple un-templated base class.

== Polymorphic chaining ==
Method chaining, also known as named parameter idiom, is a common syntax for invoking multiple method calls in object-oriented programming languages. Each method returns an object, allowing the calls to be chained together in a single statement without requiring variables to store the intermediate results.

When the named parameter object pattern is applied to an object hierarchy, things can go wrong. Suppose we have such a base class:

using std::ostream;

class Printer {
private:
    ostream& stream;
public:
    explicit Printer(ostream& out):
        stream{out} {}
 
    template <typename T>
    Printer& print(T&& t) { 
        stream << t; 
        return *this; 
    }
 
    template <typename T>
    Printer& println(T&& t) {
        stream << t << std::endl; 
        return *this; 
    }
};

Prints can be easily chained:

Printer(myStream).println("hello").println(500);

However, if we define the following derived class:

enum class Color : char {
    RED,
    ORANGE,
    YELLOW,
    GREEN,
    BLUE,
    INDIGO,
    VIOLET,
};

class CoutPrinter : public Printer {
public:
    CoutPrinter(): 
        Printer(std::cout) {}

    CoutPrinter& setConsoleColor(Color c) {
        // ...
        return *this;
    }
};

we "lose" the concrete class as soon as we invoke a function of the base:

//                           v----- we have a 'Printer' here, not a 'CoutPrinter'
CoutPrinter().print("Hello ").setConsoleColor(Color::RED).println("Printer!"); // compile error

This happens because 'print' is a function of the base – 'Printer' – and then it returns a 'Printer' instance.

The CRTP can be used to avoid such problem and to implement "Polymorphic chaining":

using std::ostream;

// Base class
template <typename ConcretePrinter>
class Printer {
private:
    ostream& stream;
public:
    explicit Printer(ostream& pstream): 
        stream{pstream} {}
 
    template <typename T>
    ConcretePrinter& print(T&& t) {
        stream << t;
        return static_cast<ConcretePrinter&>(*this);
    }
 
    template <typename T>
    ConcretePrinter& println(T&& t) {
        stream << t << std::endl;
        return static_cast<ConcretePrinter&>(*this);
    }
};

enum class Color : char {
    // colors here
};
 
// Derived class
class CoutPrinter : public Printer<CoutPrinter> {
public:
    CoutPrinter():
        Printer(cout) {}
 
    CoutPrinter& setConsoleColor(Color c) {
        // ...
        return *this;
    }
};
 
// usage
CoutPrinter().print("Hello ").setConsoleColor(Color::RED).println("Printer!");

== Polymorphic copy construction ==
When using polymorphism, one sometimes needs to create copies of objects by the base class pointer. A commonly used idiom for this is adding a virtual clone function that is defined in every derived class. The CRTP can be used to avoid having to duplicate that function or other similar functions in every derived class.

using std::unique_ptr;

// Base class has a pure virtual function for cloning
class AbstractShape {
public:
    virtual ~AbstractShape () = default;
    virtual unique_ptr<AbstractShape> clone() const = 0;
};

// This CRTP class implements clone() for Derived
template <typename Derived>
class Shape : public AbstractShape {
protected:
   // We make clear Shape class needs to be inherited
   Shape() = default;
   Shape(const Shape&) = default;
   Shape(Shape&&) = default;
public:
    unique_ptr<AbstractShape> clone() const override {
        return std::make_unique<Derived>(static_cast<Derived const&>(*this));
    }
};

// Every derived class inherits from CRTP class instead of abstract class

class Square : public Shape<Square> {
    // ...
};

class Circle : public Shape<Circle> {
    // ...
};

This allows obtaining copies of squares, circles or any other shapes by shapePtr->clone().

=== Pitfalls ===
One issue with static polymorphism is that without using a general base class like AbstractShape from the above example, derived classes cannot be stored homogeneously – that is, putting different types derived from the same base class in the same container. For example, a container defined as std::vector<Shape*> does not work because Shape is not a class, but a template needing specialization. A container defined as std::vector<Shape<Circle>*> can only store Circles, not Squares. This is because each of the classes derived from the CRTP base class Shape is a unique type. A common solution to this problem is to inherit from a shared base class with a virtual destructor, like the AbstractShape example above, allowing for the creation of a std::vector<AbstractShape*>.

== Explicit object parameters ==
The use of CRTP can be simplified using explicit object parameters (colloquially called "deducing this"), introduced in C++23. For the function signatureDish() to call a derived member function cookSignatureDish(), ChefBase needs to be a templated type and CafeChef needs to inherit from ChefBase, passing its type as the template parameter.

template <typename T>
class ChefBase {
public:
    void signatureDish() {
        static_cast<T*>(this)->cookSignatureDish();
    }
};

class CafeChef : public ChefBase<CafeChef> {
public:
    void cookSignatureDish() {
        // ...
    }
};

If an explicit object parameter is used, ChefBase does not need to be templated and CafeChef can derive from ChefBase plainly. Since the self parameter is automatically deduced as the correct derived type, no casting is required.

class ChefBase {
public:
    void signatureDish(this auto&& self) {
        self.cookSignatureDish();
    }
};

class CafeChef : public ChefBase {
public:
    void cookSignatureDish() {
        // ...
    }
};

CRTP remains necessary in some cases; explicit object parameters can only be used on non-static member functions.

== See also ==
- Barton–Nackman trick
- F-bounded quantification
