= Liquid Haskell =

- Original authors: Niki Vazou, Eric Seidel; Ranjit Jhala
- Release: 2014; 12 years ago
- Stable release: 0.9.14.1 / May 7, 2026; 4 months ago
- Written in: Haskell
- Available in: English
- Type: Formal program verifier
- License: BSD 3-clause
- Website: ucsd-progsys.github.io/liquidhaskell
- Repository: github.com/ucsd-progsys/liquidhaskell

Liquid Haskell is a program verifier for the programming language Haskell which allows specifying correctness properties by using refinement types. Properties are verified using a satisfiability modulo theories (SMT) solver which is SMTLIB2-compliant, such as the Z3 Theorem Prover.

== See also ==
- Formal verification
