= Refinement type =

Types constrained by a predicate

In type theory, a refinement type is a type endowed with a predicate which is assumed to hold for any element of the refined type. Refinement types can express preconditions when used as function arguments or postconditions when used as return types: for instance, the type of a function which accepts natural numbers and returns natural numbers greater than 5 may be written as $f: \mathbb{N} \rarr \{n \in \mathbb{N} \, | \, n > 5\}$. Refinement types are thus related to behavioral subtyping.

== History ==
The concept of refinement types was first introduced in Freeman and Pfenning's 1991 Refinement types for ML, which presents a type system for a subset of Standard ML. The type system "preserves the decidability of ML's type inference" whilst still "allowing more errors to be detected at compile-time". In more recent times, refinement type systems have been developed (primarily in academia) for languages such as Haskell, TypeScript, Rust, and as libraries for real world usage in Scala.

== See also ==
- Liquid Haskell
- Dependent types
