= Barbara Liskov =

American computer scientist

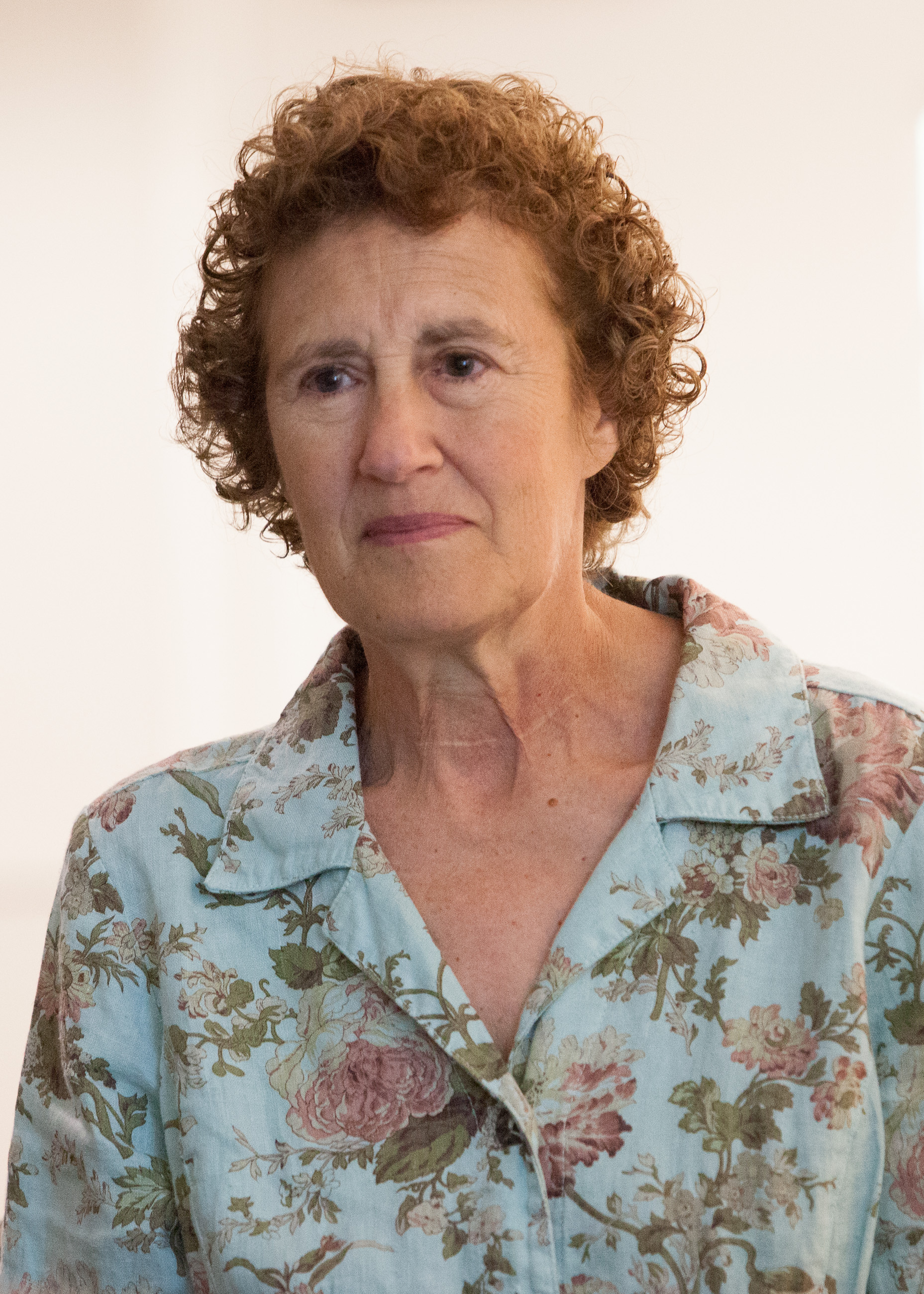
- Liskov in 2010
- Born: Barbara Jane Huberman; November 7, 1939 (age 87); Los Angeles, California, US
- Education: University of California, Berkeley (BA); Stanford University (MS, PhD)
- Known for: Venus (operating system); CLU; Argus; Thor (object-oriented database); Liskov substitution principle
- Spouse: Nathan Liskov (m. 1970)
- Children: 1
- Awards: IEEE John von Neumann Medal (2004); A. M. Turing Award (2008) National Inventors Hall of Fame (2012); Computer Pioneer Award (2018)
- Scientific career
- Fields: Computer science
- Workplaces: Massachusetts Institute of Technology
- Thesis: A Program to Play Chess End Games (1968)
- Doctoral advisor: John McCarthy
- Doctoral students: Maurice Herlihy; J. Eliot Moss; Sanjay Ghemawat

Barbara Jane Liskov (née Huberman; born November 7, 1939) is an American computer scientist who has made pioneering contributions to programming languages and distributed computing. Her notable work includes the introduction of abstract data types and the accompanying principle of data abstraction, along with the Liskov substitution principle, which applies these ideas to object-oriented programming, subtyping, and inheritance. Her work was recognized with the 2008 Turing Award, the highest distinction in computer science.

Liskov is one of the earliest women to have been granted a doctorate in computer science in the United States, and the second woman to receive the Turing Award. She is currently an Institute Professor and Ford Professor of Engineering at the Massachusetts Institute of Technology.

== Early life and education ==
Liskov was born November 7, 1939, in Los Angeles, California, the eldest of Jane (née Dickhoff) and Moses Huberman's four children. She earned her bachelor's degree in mathematics with a minor in physics at the University of California, Berkeley in 1961. At Berkeley, she had only one other female classmate in her major. She applied to graduate mathematics programs at Berkeley and Princeton. At the time, Princeton was not accepting female students in mathematics. She was accepted at Berkeley but instead moved to Boston and began working at the MITRE Corporation, where she became interested in computers and programming. She worked at Mitre for one year before taking a programming job at Harvard, where she worked on language translation.

She then decided to go back to school and applied again to Berkeley, but also to Stanford and Harvard. In March 1968 she became one of the first women in the United States to be awarded a Ph.D. from a computer science department at Stanford University. At Stanford, she worked with John McCarthy and was supported in her work in artificial intelligence. The topic of her Ph.D. thesis was a computer program to play chess endgames, for which she developed the important killer heuristic.

== Career ==
After graduating from Stanford, Liskov returned to Mitre to work as a research staff.

Liskov has led many significant projects, including the Venus operating system, a small, low-cost time-sharing system; the design and implementation of CLU; Argus, the first high-level language to support the implementation of distributed programs and to demonstrate the technique of promise pipelining; and Thor, an object-oriented database system. With Jeannette Wing, she developed a particular definition of subtyping, commonly known as the Liskov substitution principle. She leads the Programming Methodology Group at MIT, with a current research focus in Byzantine fault tolerance and distributed computing. She was on the inaugural Engineering and Computer Science jury for the Infosys Prize in 2009. Liskov's design and development of CLU and Argus would later have influence on many well-known programming languages such as Java, C++, C#, and Ada.

Liskov's formulation of the Liskov substitution principle (LSP) has had a lasting influence on software engineering theory and practice. The principle became a foundational concept in software engineering education, where it is widely taught as a formal criterion for subtype correctness in object-oriented design. It is commonly presented in university curricula and textbooks as a key rule for reasoning about behavioral compatibility in programs.

== Recognition and awards ==
Liskov is a member of the National Academy of Engineering, the National Academy of Sciences, and a fellow of the American Academy of Arts and Sciences and of the Association for Computing Machinery (ACM). In 2002, she was recognized as one of the top women faculty members at MIT, and among the top 50 faculty members in the sciences in the U.S. In 2002, Discover magazine recognized Liskov as one of the 50 most important women in science.

In 2004, Barbara Liskov won the John von Neumann Medal for "fundamental contributions to programming languages, programming methodology, and distributed systems". On 19 November, 2005, Barbara Liskov and Donald E. Knuth were awarded ETH Honorary Doctorates. Liskov and Knuth were also featured in the ETH Zurich Distinguished Colloquium Series. She was awarded a Doctorate Honoris Causa by the University of Lugano in 2011 and by Universidad Politécnica de Madrid in 2018.

Liskov received the 2008 Turing Award from the ACM in March 2009, for her work in the design of programming languages and software methodology that led to the development of object-oriented programming. Specifically, Liskov developed two programming languages, CLU in the 1970s and Argus in the 1980s. The ACM cited her contributions to the practical and theoretical foundations of "programming language and system design, especially related to data abstraction, fault tolerance, and distributed computing". In 2012, she was inducted into the National Inventors Hall of Fame.

In 2023 Liskov was awarded the Benjamin Franklin Medal from the Franklin Institute for "seminal contributions to computer programming languages and methodology, enabling the implementation of reliable, reusable programs".

== Selected works ==
Liskov is the author of five books as of February 2023 and over one hundred technical papers.

=== Books ===
- Liskov, Barbara; Atkinson, R.; Bloom, T.; Moss, E.; Schaffert, J. C.; Scheifler, R.; Snyder, A. (1981). CLU: Reference Manual. Springer Berlin Heidelberg. ISBN 978-3-540-10836-8.
- Alford, M. W.; Ansart, J. P.; Hommel, G.; Lamport, L.; Liskov, Barbara; Mullery, G. P.; Schneider, F. B. (1985). Distributed Systems: Methods and Tools for Specification. An Advanced Course. Springer Berlin Heidelberg. ISBN 978-3-540-15216-3.
- Liskov, Barbara; Guttag, John (1986). Abstraction and Specification in Program Development. MIT Press. ISBN 978-0-262-12112-5.
- Liskov, Barbara; Guttag, John (2000). Program Development in Java: Abstraction, Specification, and Object-Oriented Design. Pearson Education. ISBN 978-0-7686-8496-4.

=== Selected papers ===
- Liskov, Barbara; Zilles, Stephen (1974-03-28). "Programming with abstract data types". ACM SIGPLAN Notices. 9 (4): 50–59. doi:10.1145/942572.807045. ISSN 0362-1340.
- Liskov, Barbara; Snyder, Alan; Atkinson, Russell; Schaffert, Craig (1977-08-01). "Abstraction mechanisms in CLU". Communications of the ACM. 20 (8): 564–576. doi:10.1145/359763.359789. ISSN 0001-0782. S2CID 17343380.
- Ladin, Rivka; Liskov, Barbara; Shrira, Liuba; Ghemawat, Sanjay (1992-11-01). "Providing high availability using lazy replication". ACM Transactions on Computer Systems. 10 (4): 360–391. doi:10.1145/138873.138877. ISSN 0734-2071. S2CID 2219840.
- Liskov, Barbara H.; Wing, Jeannette M. (1994-11-01). "A behavioral notion of subtyping". ACM Transactions on Programming Languages and Systems. 16 (6): 1811–1841. doi:10.1145/197320.197383. ISSN 0164-0925. S2CID 999172.
- Castro, Miguel; Liskov, Barbara (1999-02-22). "Practical Byzantine fault tolerance". Proceedings of the Third Symposium on Operating Systems Design and Implementation. OSDI '99. USA: USENIX Association. pp. 173–186. ISBN 978-1-880446-39-3.
- Myers, Andrew C.; Liskov, Barbara (2000-10-01). "Protecting privacy using the decentralized label model". ACM Transactions on Software Engineering and Methodology. 9 (4): 410–442. doi:10.1145/363516.363526. ISSN 1049-331X. S2CID 9600486.

== Personal life ==
Liskov is Jewish. In 1970, she married Nathan Liskov. They have one son, Moses, who earned a Ph.D. in computer science from MIT in 2004 and teaches computer science at the College of William & Mary.

== See also ==
- List of pioneers in computer science
- Women in computing
- Timeline of women in science
