= Jeannette Wing =

American computer scientist (born 1956)

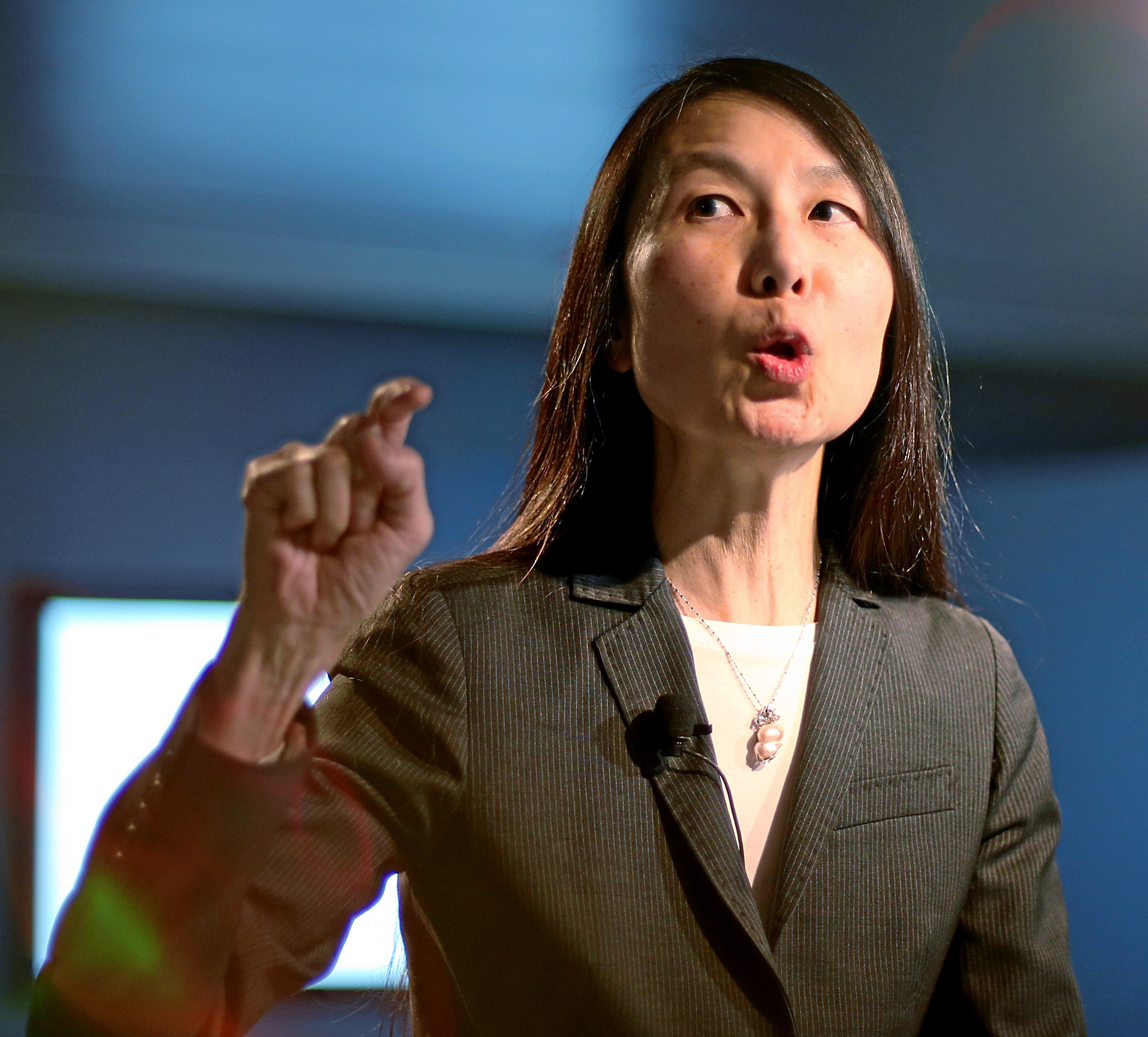
- Wing at the World Economic Forum on January 26, 2013
- Born: Jeannette Marie Wing; December 4, 1956 (age 69)
- Education: Massachusetts Institute of Technology (BS, MS, PhD)
- Scientific career
- Fields: Computer science
- Workplaces: Columbia University; Carnegie Mellon University; University of Southern California
- Thesis: A Two-Tiered Approach to Specifying Programs (1983)
- Doctoral advisor: John Guttag
- Doctoral students: Greg Morrisett
- Website: cs.cmu.edu/~wing/

Jeannette Marie Wing is the Executive Vice President for Research at Columbia University, where she is also a professor of computer science. Prior to her appointment on September 1, 2021, she served as the Avanessians Director of the Data Science Institute at Columbia University. Until June 30, 2017, she was Corporate Vice President of Microsoft Research with oversight of its core research laboratories around the world and Microsoft Research Connections. Prior to 2013, she was the President's Professor of Computer Science at Carnegie Mellon University. She also served as assistant director for Computer and Information Science and Engineering at the NSF from 2007 to 2010. She was appointed the Columbia University executive vice president for research in 2021.

== Background ==
Wing earned her S.B. and S.M. in Electrical Engineering and Computer Science at MIT in June 1979. Her advisers were Ronald Rivest and John Reiser. In 1983, she earned her Ph.D. in Computer Science at MIT under John Guttag. She is a fourth-degree black belt in Tang Soo Do.

== Career and research ==
Wing was on the faculty of the University of Southern California from 1982 to 1985 and then the faculty of Carnegie Mellon from 1985 to 2012. She served as the head of the Computer Science Department from 2004 to 2007 and from 2010 to 2012. In January 2013, she took a leave from Carnegie Mellon to work at Microsoft Research.

Wing has been a leading member of the formal methods community, especially in the area of Larch. She has led many research projects and has published widely.

With Barbara Liskov, she developed the Liskov substitution principle, published in 1993.

She has also been a strong promoter of computational thinking, expressing the algorithmic problem-solving and abstraction techniques used by computer scientists and how they might be applied in other disciplines.

She is a member of the editorial board of the following journals:

- Foundations and Trends in Privacy and Security (co-Editor-in-Chief)
- Journal of the ACM
- Formal Aspects of Computing (North American Editor)
- Formal Methods in System Design
- International Journal of Software and Informatics
- Journal of Information Science and Engineering
- Software Tools for Technology Transfer

== Recognition ==
Wing was named a Fellow of the ACM in 1998, "For fundamental contributions to formal methods, programming languages, and programming methodology, and for promoting the use of formal methods in software development". Wing was named a Fellow of the IEEE in 2003, "for contributions to methods for software systems". Wing was elected as a member of the National Academy of Engineering in 2024, for "For formulation and advocacy of computational thinking, and for contributions to formal methods and trustworthy computing". Wing was featured in WomenTech Network's "100 Executive Women in Tech to Watch" list in 2025.
