= Java syntax =

Rules defining correctly structured Java programs

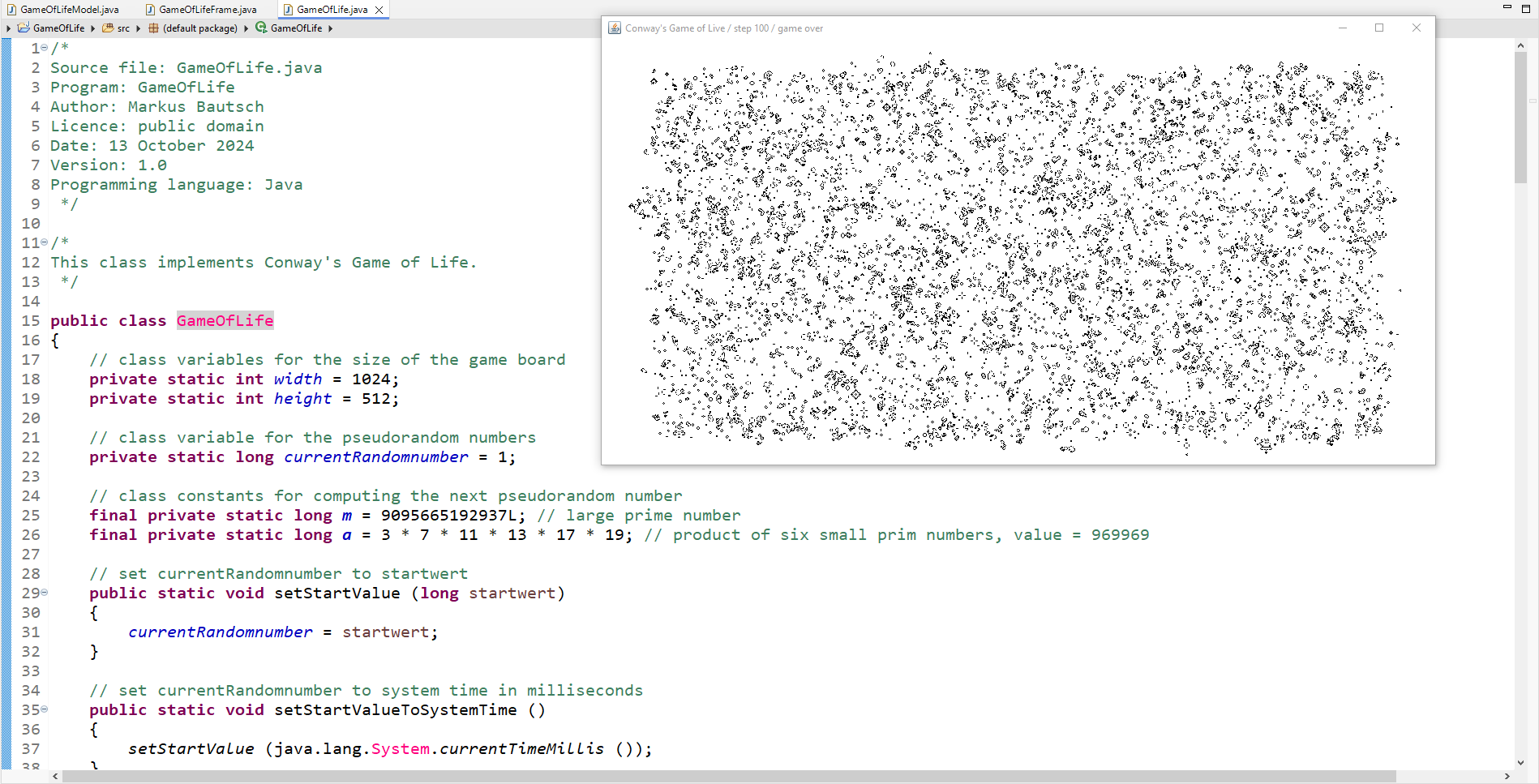
A snippet of Java code.

The syntax of Java is the set of rules defining how a Java program is written and interpreted.

The syntax is mostly derived from C and C++. Unlike C++, Java has no global functions or variables, but has data members which are also regarded as global variables. All code belongs to classes and all values are objects. The only exception is the primitive data types, which are not considered to be objects for performance reasons (though can be automatically converted to objects and vice versa via autoboxing). Some features like operator overloading or unsigned integer data types are omitted to simplify the language and avoid possible programming mistakes.

The Java syntax has been gradually extended in the course of numerous major JDK releases, and now supports abilities such as generic programming and anonymous functions (function literals, called lambda expressions in Java). Since 2017, a new JDK version is released twice a year.

== Basics ==
The Java "Hello, World!" program program is as follows:

public class HelloWorld {
    public static void main(String[] args) {
        System.out.println("Hello World!");
    }
}

Since Java 25, a simplified Hello World program without an explicit class may be written:

void main() {
    IO.println("Hello World!");
}

=== Identifier ===
An identifier is the name of an element in the code. There are certain standard naming conventions to follow when selecting names for elements. Identifiers in Java are case-sensitive.

An identifier can contain:

- Any Unicode character that is a letter (including numeric letters like Roman numerals) or digit.
- Currency sign (such as ¥).
- Connecting punctuation character (such as _).

An identifier cannot:

- Start with a digit.
- Be equal to a reserved keyword, null literal or Boolean literal.

Since Java 22, the identifier of just an underscore (_) acts as an unnamed placeholder; it can be reused in multiple declarations in the same scope (like int _ = nextValue();), and suppresses compiler warnings of no use (equivalent to the @SuppressWarnings("unused") annotation); trying to read and write to _ later is ill-formed. In pattern matching, it suppresses unused fields.

=== Keywords ===
==== Keywords ====
The following words are keywords and cannot be used as identifiers under any circumstances, of which there are 47.

- _
- abstract
- assert
- boolean
- break
- byte
- case
- catch
- char
- class
- continue
- default
- do
- double
- else
- enum
- extends
- final
- finally
- float
- for
- if
- implements
- import
- instanceof
- int
- interface
- long
- native
- new
- package
- private
- protected
- public
- return
- short
- static
- super
- switch
- synchronized
- this
- throw
- throws
- transient
- try
- void
- volatile
- while

==== Reserved identifiers ====
The following words are contextual keywords and are only restricted in certain contexts, of which there are 16.

- exports
- module
- non-sealed
- open
- opens
- permits
- provides
- record
- requires
- sealed
- to
- transitive
- var
- when
- with
- yield

==== Reserved words for literal values ====
The following words refer to literal values used by the language, of which there are 3.

- true
- false
- null

==== Unused ====
The following words are reserved as keywords, but currently have no use or purpose, of which there are 4.

- const
- goto
- strictfp

=== Literals ===
Integers
binary (introduced in Java SE 7)	0b11110101 (0b followed by a binary number)
octal	0365 (0 followed by an octal number)
hexadecimal	0xF5 (0x followed by a hexadecimal number)
decimal	245 (decimal number)
Floating-point values
float	23.5F, .5f, 1.72E3F (decimal fraction with an optional exponent indicator, followed by F)
float	0x.5FP0F, 0x.5P-6f (0x followed by a hexadecimal fraction with a mandatory exponent indicator and a suffix F)
double	23.5D, .5, 5., 1.72E3D (decimal fraction with an optional exponent indicator, followed by optional D)
double	0x.5FP0, 0x.5P-6D (0x followed by a hexadecimal fraction with a mandatory exponent indicator and an optional suffix D)
Character literals
char	'a', 'Z', '\u0231' (character or a character escape, enclosed in single quotes)
Boolean literals
boolean	true, false
null literal
null reference	null
String literals
String	"Hello, World" (sequence of characters and character escapes enclosed in double quotes)
Characters escapes in strings
Unicode character	\u3876 (\u followed by the hexadecimal unicode code point up to U+FFFF)
Octal escape	\352 (octal number not exceeding 377, preceded by backslash)
Line feed	\n
Carriage return	\r
Form feed	\f
Backslash	\\
Single quote	\'
Double quote	\"
Tab	\t
Backspace	\b

Integer literals are of int type by default unless long type is specified by appending L or l suffix to the literal, e.g. 367L. Since Java SE 7, it is possible to include underscores between the digits of a number to increase readability; for example, a number 145608987 can be written as 145_608_987.

=== Variables ===
Variables are identifiers associated with values. They are declared by writing the variable's type and name, and are optionally initialized in the same statement by assigning a value.

int count; // Declaring an uninitialized variable called 'count', of type 'int'
count = 35; //Initializing the variable
int count = 35; // Declaring and initializing the variable at the same time

Multiple variables of the same type can be declared and initialized in one statement using comma as a delimiter.

int a, b; // Declaring multiple variables of the same type
int a = 2, b = 3; // Declaring and initializing multiple variables of the same type

==== Type inference ====
Since Java 10, it has become possible to infer types for the variables automatically by using var.

import java.io.FileOutputStream;

// stream will have the FileOutputStream type as inferred from its initializer
var stream = new FileOutputStream("file.txt");

// An equivalent declaration with an explicit type
FileOutputStream stream = new FileOutputStream("file.txt");

However, unlike C++, the return type of a function cannot be inferred.

=== Code blocks ===
The separators { and } signify a code block and a new scope. Class members and the body of a method are examples of what can live inside these braces in various contexts.

Inside of method bodies, braces may be used to create new scopes, as follows:

void doSomething() {
    int a;

    {
        int b;
        a = 1;
    }

    a = 2;
    b = 3; // Illegal because the variable b is declared in an inner scope..
}

=== Comments ===
Java has three kinds of comments: traditional comments, end-of-line comments and documentation comments.

Traditional comments, also known as block comments, start with /* and end with */, they may span across multiple lines. This type of comment was derived from C and C++.

/* This is a multi-line comment.
It may occupy more than one line. */

End-of-line comments start with // and extend to the end of the current line. This comment type is also present in C++ and in modern C.

// This is an end-of-line comment

Documentation comments in the source files are processed by the Javadoc tool to generate documentation. This type of comment is identical to traditional comments, except it starts with /** and follows conventions defined by the Javadoc tool. Technically, these comments are a special kind of traditional comment and they are not specifically defined in the language specification.

/**
 * This is a documentation comment.
 * 
 * @author John Doe
 */

=== Universal types ===
Classes in the package java.lang (but not its subpackages) are implicitly imported into every program, as long as no explicitly-imported types have the same names. Important ones include:

==== java.lang.System ====
java.lang.System is one of the most fundamental classes in Java. It is a utility class for interacting with the system, containing standard input, output, and error streams, system properties and environment variables, time, and more.

==== java.lang.Object ====
java.lang.Object is Java's top type. It is implicitly the superclass of all classes that do not declare any parent class (thus all classes in Java inherit from java.lang.Object). All values can be converted to this type, although for primitive values this involves autoboxing.

==== java.lang.Record ====
All records implicitly extend java.lang.Record. Thus, a record, while treated as a class, cannot extend any other class.

==== java.lang.Enum<E> ====
All enumerated types (enums) in Java implicitly extend java.lang.Enum. Thus, an enum, while treated as a class, cannot extend any other class. The type parameter E is constrained as Enum<E extends Enum<E>>.

==== java.lang.Class<T> ====
java.lang.Class is a class that represents a class or interface in the application at runtime. It cannot be constructed via direct instantiation, but is rather created by the JVM when a class is derived from the bytes of a .class file. A class literal can be obtained through X.class on such a class X. For instance, String.class returns Class<String>. An unknown class being modeled can be represented as Class<?> (where ? denotes a wildcard).

While X.class appears to be accessing a field named "class", there is actually no such field named "class"; it is in fact performing the instruction ldc, which pushes a constant from the class's runtime constant pool into the operand stack.

==== java.lang.String ====
java.lang.String is Java's basic string type. It is immutable. It does not implement Iterable<Character> (see java.lang.Iterable), so it cannot be iterated over in a for-each loop, but can be converted to char[]. Some methods treat each UTF-16 code unit as a char, but methods to convert to an int[] that is effectively UTF-32 are also available. java.lang.String implements java.lang.CharSequence, so chars in the java.lang.String can be accessed by the method charAt().

==== java.lang.Throwable ====
java.lang.Throwable is the supertype of everything that can be thrown or caught with Java's throw and catch statements. Its direct known subclasses are java.lang.Error (for serious unrecoverable errors) and java.lang.Exception (for exceptions that may naturally occur in the execution of a program).

===== java.lang.Error =====
java.lang.Error is the supertype of all error classes and extends java.lang.Throwable. It is used to indicate conditions that a reasonable application should not catch.

===== java.lang.Exception =====
java.lang.Exception is the supertype of all exception classes and extends java.lang.Throwable. It is used to indicate conditions that a reasonable application may have reason to catch.

==== java.lang.Math ====
java.lang.Math is a utility class containing mathematical functions and mathematical constants (such as Math.sin(), Math.pow(), and Math.PI).

==== java.lang.IO ====
java.lang.IO is a class introduced in Java 25 (previously residing in java.io as java.io.IO). It allows simpler access to the standard input and output streams over System.in and System.out.

==== Primitives ====
Each primitive type has an associated wrapper class (see primitive types).

== Program structure ==
Java applications consist of collections of classes. Classes exist in packages but can also be nested inside other classes.

=== main method ===
Every Java application must have an entry point. This is true of both graphical interface applications and console applications. The entry point is the main method. There can be more than one class with a main method, but the main class is always defined externally (for example, in a manifest file). The main method along with the main class must be declared public. The method must be static and is passed command-line arguments as an array of strings. Unlike C++ or C#, it never returns a value and must return void. However, a return code can be specified to the operating system by calling System.exit().

public static void main(String[] args) {
    // ...
}

=== Packages ===
Packages are a part of a class name and they are used to group and/or distinguish named entities from other ones. Another purpose of packages is to govern code access together with access modifiers. For example, java.io.InputStream is a fully qualified class name for the class InputStream which is located in the package java.io.

A package is essentially a namespace. Packages do not have hierarchies, even though the periods may suggest so. A package can be controlled whether it is accessible externally or internally of a project using modules.

A package is declared at the start of the file with the package declaration:

package org.wikipedia.examples;

public class Foo {
    // ...
}

Classes with the public modifier must be placed in the files with the same name and .java extension and put into nested folders corresponding to the package name. The above class org.wikipedia.examples.Foo will have the following path: org/wikipedia/examples/Foo.java.

=== Modules ===
Modular programming (modules) is used to group packages and tightly control what packages belong to the public API. Contrary to JAR files, modules explicitly declare which modules they depend on, and what packages they export. Explicit dependency declarations improve the integrity of the code, by making it easier to reason about large applications and the dependencies between software components.

The module declaration is placed in a file named module-info.java at the root of the module's source-file hierarchy. The JDK will verify dependencies and interactions between modules both at compile-time and runtime.

For example, the following module declaration declares that the module org.wikipedia.bar depends on another org.wikipedia.baz module, and exports the following packages: org.wikipedia.bar.alpha and org.wikipedia.bar.beta:

module org.wikipedia.bar {
    requires org.wikipedia.baz;

    exports org.wikipedia.bar.alpha;
    exports org.wikipedia.bar.beta;
}

The public members of org.wikipedia.bar.alpha and org.wikipedia.bar.beta packages will be accessible by dependent modules. Private members are inaccessible even through a means such as reflective programming (reflection). In Java versions 9 through 16, whether such 'illegal access' is de facto permitted depends on a command line setting.

The JDK became modularized in Java 9. For example, the majority of the Java standard library is exported by the module java.base.

=== Import declaration ===
An import statement is used to resolve a type belonging to another package (namespace). It can be seen as similar to using in C++.

==== Type import declaration ====
A type import declaration allows a named type to be referred to by a simple name rather than the full name that includes the package. Import declarations can be single type import declarations or import-on-demand declarations. Import declarations must be placed at the top of a code file after the package declaration.

package org.wikipedia.examples;

import java.util.Random; // Single type declaration

public class ImportsTest {
    public static void main(String[] args) {
        /* The following line is equivalent to
         * java.util.Random random = new java.util.Random();
         * It would have been incorrect without the import.
         */
        Random random = new Random();
    }
}

Import-on-demand declarations are mentioned in the code. A "wildcard import" (or "glob import") imports all the types of the package. A "static import" imports members of the package.

/**
 * This form of importing classes makes all classes
 * in package java.util available by name, could be used instead of the
 * import declaration in the previous example.
 */
import java.util.*;

A wildcard import may possibly import nothing, if no symbols exist in that package. For example, statements like import java.*; are legal, but do nothing, as all classes reside in packages within package java; such an import would not import all classes in the package recursively.

==== Static import declaration ====
This type of declaration has been available since J2SE 5.0. Static import declarations allow access to static members defined in another class, interface, annotation, or enum; without specifying the class name:

import static java.lang.System.out; // 'out' is a static field in java.lang.System

public class HelloWorld {
    public static void main(String[] args) {
        /* The following line is equivalent to
             System.out.println("Hi World!");
           and would have been incorrect without the import declaration. */
        out.println("Hello World!");
    }
}

Import-on-demand declarations allow to import all the fields of the type:

/**
 * This form of declaration makes all
 * fields in the java.lang.System class available by name, and may be used instead
 * of the import declaration in the previous example.
 */
import static java.lang.System.*;

Enum constants may also be used with static import. For example, this enum is in the package called screen:

public enum Colors {
    RED, BLUE, GREEN
};

It is possible to use static import declarations in another class to retrieve the enum constants:

import org.wikipedia.screen.ColorName;
import static org.wikipedia.screen.ColorName.*;

public class Dots {
    /* The following line is equivalent to 'ColorName foo = ColorName.RED',
       and it would have been incorrect without the static import. */
    ColorName foo = RED;

    void shift() {
        /* The following line is equivalent to
           if (foo == ColorName.RED) foo = ColorName.BLUE; */
        if (foo == RED) {
            foo = BLUE;
        }
    }
}

==== Module import declaration ====
Since Java 25, modules can be used in import statements to automatically import all the packages exported by the module. This is done using import module. For example, import module java.sql; is equivalent to

import java.sql.*;
import javax.sql.*;
// Remaining indirect exports from java.logging, java.transaction.xa, and java.xml

Similarly, import module java.base;, similarly, imports all 54 packages belonging to java.base.

import module java.base;

/**
 * importing module java.base allows us to avoid manually importing most classes
 * the following classes (outside of java.lang) are used:
 * java.text.MessageFormat
 * java.util.Date
 * java.util.List
 * java.util.concurrent.ThreadLocalRandom
 */
public class Example {
    public static void main(String[] args) {
        List<String> colours = List.of("Red", "Orange", "Yellow", "Green", "Blue", "Indigo", "Violet");
        IO.println(MessageFormat.format("My favourite colour is {0} and today is {1,date,long}",
            colours.get(ThreadLocalRandom.current().nextInt(colours.size())),
            new Date()
        ));
    }
}

== Operators ==
Operators in Java are similar to those in C++. However, there is no delete operator due to garbage collection mechanisms in Java, and there are no operations on pointers since Java does not support them. Another difference is that Java has an unsigned right shift operator (>>>), while C's right shift operator's signedness is type-dependent. Operators in Java cannot be overloaded. The only overloaded operator is operator+ for string concatenation.

Precedence	Operator	Description	Associativity
1	()	Method invocation	Left-to-right
1	[]	Array access	Left-to-right
1	.	Class member selection	Left-to-right
2	++ --	Postfix increment and decrement	Left-to-right
3	++ --	Prefix increment and decrement	Right-to-left
3	+ -	Unary plus and minus	Right-to-left
3	! ~	Logical NOT and bitwise NOT	Right-to-left
3	(type) val	Type cast	Right-to-left
3	new	Class instance or array creation	Right-to-left
4	* / %	Multiplication, division, and modulus (remainder)	Left-to-right
5	+ -	Addition and subtraction	Left-to-right
5	+	String concatenation	Left-to-right
6	<< >> >>>	Bitwise left shift, signed right shift and unsigned right shift	Left-to-right
7	< <=	Relational "less than" and "less than or equal to"	Left-to-right
7	> >=	Relational "greater than" and "greater than or equal to"	Left-to-right
7	instanceof	Type comparison	Left-to-right
8	== !=	Relational "equal to" and "not equal to"	Left-to-right
9	&	Bitwise and logical AND	Left-to-right
10	^	Bitwise and logical XOR (exclusive or)	Left-to-right
11	|	Bitwise and logical OR (inclusive or)	Left-to-right
12	&&	Logical conditional-AND	Left-to-right
13	||	Logical conditional-OR	Left-to-right
14	c ? t : f	Ternary conditional (see ?:)	Right-to-left
15	=	Simple assignment	Right-to-left
15	+= -=	Assignment by sum and difference	Right-to-left
15	*= /= %=	Assignment by product, quotient, and remainder	Right-to-left
15	<<= >>= >>>=	Assignment by bitwise left shift, signed right shift and unsigned right shift	Right-to-left
15	&= ^= |=	Assignment by bitwise AND, XOR, and OR	Right-to-left

== Control structures ==
=== Conditional statements ===
==== if statement ====
if statements in Java are similar to those in C and use the same syntax:

if (i == 3) {
    doSomething();
}

if statement may include optional else block, in which case it becomes an if-then-else statement:

if (i == 3) {
    doSomething();
} else {
    doSomethingElse();
}

Like C, else-if construction does not involve any special keywords, it is formed as a sequence of separate if-then-else statements:

if (i == 3) {
    doSomething();
} else if (i == 2) {
    doSomethingElse();
} else {
    doSomethingDifferent();
}

Also, a ?: operator can be used in place of simple if statement, for example

int a = 1;
int b = 2;
int minVal = (a < b) ? a : b;

==== switch statement ====
Switch statements in Java can use byte, short, char, and int (not long) primitive data types or their corresponding wrapper types. Starting with J2SE 5.0, it is possible to use enum types. Starting with Java SE 7, it is possible to use Strings. Other reference types cannot be used in switch statements.

Possible values are listed using case labels. These labels in Java may contain only constants (including enum constants and string constants). Execution will start after the label corresponding to the expression inside the brackets. An optional default label may be present to declare that the code following it will be executed if none of the case labels correspond to the expression.

Code for each label ends with the break keyword. It is possible to omit it causing the execution to proceed to the next label, however, a warning will usually be reported during compilation.

switch (ch) {
    case 'A':
        doSomething(); // Triggered if ch == 'A'
        break;
    case 'B':
    case 'C':
        doSomethingElse(); // Triggered if ch == 'B' or ch == 'C'
        break;
    default:
        doSomethingDifferent(); // Triggered in any other case
        break;
}

Unlike C and C++, whose switch only supports integral types, Java's switch supports strings:

switch (s) {
    case "Foo":
        handleFoo();
    case "Bar":
        handleBar();
    default:
        fallbackHandler();
}

===== switch expressions =====
Since Java 14 it has become possible to use switch expressions, which use the new arrow syntax:

enum Result {
    GREAT,
    FINE,
    // more enum values
}

Result result = switch (ch) {
    case 'A' -> Result.GREAT;
    case 'B', 'C' -> Result.FINE;
    default -> throw new Exception();
};

Alternatively, there is a possibility to express the same with the yield statement, although it is recommended to prefer the arrow syntax because it avoids the problem of accidental fall throughs.

Result result = switch (ch) {
    case 'A':
        yield Result.GREAT;
    case 'B':
    case 'C':
        yield Result.FINE;
    default:
        throw new Exception();
};

===== Pattern matching =====
The switch block can be used for pattern matching. Cases can be guarded with a when clause.

import java.util.Collection;

void handleInput(Object obj) {
    switch (obj) {
        case Collection<?> c when c.isEmpty() ->
            IO.println("An empty collection of some kind");
        case String s when s.length() > 50 ->
            IO.println("A string longer than 50 characters");
        case String s ->
            IO.println("A string: " + s);
        default ->
            IO.println("Some other object");
    }
}

Records can be pattern matched over like so:

record Point(int x, int y) {}

void locatePoint(Object obj) {
    switch (obj) {
        case Point(int x, int y) when x == y ->
            IO.println("The point is on the diagonal line at " + x);
        case Point(int x, int y) when x > 0 && y > 0 ->
            IO.println("The point is somewhere in the first quadrant");
        case Point p ->
            IO.println("The point is somewhere else");
        default ->
            IO.println("Not a point");
    }
}

Nested patterns are supported, like the following example. A "wildcard" placeholder, expressed with _, is used to suppress a variable or object that does not need identification.

record Dimensions(double width, double height) {}
record Box(String label, Dimensions dims) {}

void inspectBox(Object obj) {
    switch (obj) {
        case Box(String label, Dimensions(_, double height)) when height > 50.0 ->
            System.out.printf("The box '%s' is too tall to fit on the shelf!", label);
        case Box(String label, _) ->
            System.out.printf("The box '%s' fits standard dimensions.");
        default ->
            IO.println("Not a box.");
    }
}

=== Iteration statements ===
Iteration statements are statements that are repeatedly executed when a given condition is evaluated as true. Since J2SE 5.0, Java has four forms of such statements. The condition must have type boolean or java.lang.Boolean. Java does not implicitly convert integers or class types to Boolean values.

For example, the following code is valid in C but results in a compilation error in Java.

while (1) {
    doSomething();
}

==== while loop ====
In the while loop, the test is done before each iteration.

while (i < 10) {
    doSomething();
}

==== do-while loop ====
In the do-while loop, the test is done after each iteration. Consequently, the code is always executed at least once.

// doSomething() is called at least once
do {
    doSomething();
} while (i < 10);

==== for loop ====
for loops in Java include an initializer, a condition and a counter expression. It is possible to include several expressions of the same kind using comma as delimiter (except in the condition). However, unlike C, the comma is just a delimiter and not an operator.

for (int i = 0; i < 10; i++) {
    doSomething();
}
 
// A more complex loop using two variables
for (int i = 0, j = 9; i < 10; i++, j -= 3) {
    doSomething();
}

Like C, all three expressions are optional. The following loop never terminates:

for (;;) {
    doSomething();
}

==== Foreach loop ====
Foreach loops have been available since J2SE 5.0. This type of loop uses built-in iterators over arrays and collections to return each item in the given collection; only arrays and types that implement java.lang.Iterable may be used in a foreach loop. Every element is returned and reachable in the context of the code block. When the block is executed, the next item is returned until there are no items remaining. This for loop from Java was later added to C++11. Unlike C#, this kind of loop does not involve a special keyword, but instead uses a different notation style.

for (int i : intArray) {
    doSomething(i);
}

=== Jump statements ===
==== Labels ====
Labels are given points in code used by break and continue statements. While goto is a reserved keyword in Java, it cannot be used to jump to specific points in code (in fact, it has no use at all).

start:
someMethod();

==== break statement ====
The break statement breaks out of the closest loop or switch statement. Execution continues in the statement after the terminated statement, if any.

for (int i = 0; i < 10; i++) {
    while (true) {
        break;
    }
    // Will break to this point
}

It is possible to break out of the outer loop using labels:

outer:
for (int i = 0; i < 10; i++) {
    while (true) {
        break outer;
    }
}
// Will break to this point

==== continue statement ====
The continue statement discontinues the current iteration of the current control statement and begins the next iteration. The following while loop in the code below reads characters by calling getChar(), skipping the statements in the body of the loop if the characters are spaces:

int ch;
while (ch == getChar()) {
    if (ch == ' ') {
        continue; // Skips the rest of the while-loop
    }

    // Rest of the while-loop, will not be reached if ch == ' '
    doSomething();
}

Labels can be specified in continue statements and break statements:

outer:
for (String str : stringsArr) {
    char[] strChars = str.toCharArray();
    for (char ch : strChars) {
        if (ch == ' ') {
            /* Continues the outer cycle and the next
            string is retrieved from stringsArr */
            continue outer;
        }
        doSomething(ch);
    }
}

==== return statement ====
The return statement is used to end method execution and to return a value. A value returned by the method is written after the return keyword. If the method returns anything but void, it must use the return statement to return some value.

void doSomething(boolean streamClosed) {
    // If streamClosed is true, execution is stopped
    if (streamClosed) {
        return;
    }
    readFromStream();
}

int calculateSum(int a, int b) {
    int result = a + b;
    return result;
}

return statement ends execution immediately, except for one case: if the statement is encountered within a try block and it is complemented by a finally, control is passed to the finally block.

void doSomething(boolean streamClosed) {
    try {
        if (streamClosed) {
            return;
        }
        readFromStream();
    } finally {
        // Will be called last even if readFromStream() was not called
        freeResources();
    }
}

=== Exception handling statements ===
==== try-catch-finally statements ====
Exceptions are managed within try-catch blocks.

try {
    // Statements that may throw exceptions
    methodThrowingExceptions();
} catch (Exception e) {
    // Exception caught and handled here
    reportException(e);
} finally {
    // Statements always executed after the try/catch blocks
    freeResources();
}

The statements within the try block are executed, and if any of them throws an exception, execution of the block is discontinued and the exception is handled by the catch block. There may be multiple catch blocks, in which case the first block with an exception variable whose type matches the type of the thrown exception is executed.

Java SE 7 also introduced multi-catch clauses besides uni-catch clauses. This type of catch clauses allows Java to handle different types of exceptions in a single block provided they are not subclasses of each other. While it appears to resemble a union type, it is actually in fact the most specific common supertype of the alternatives.

import java.net.HttpRetryException;
import java.net.http.HttpTimeoutException;

void makeRequest() throws HttpRetryException, HttpTimeoutException {
    // ...
}

void main(String[] args) {
    try {
        methodThrowingExceptions();
    } catch (HttpRetryException | HttpTimeoutException e) {
        // Both HttpRetryException and HttpTimeoutException will be caught and handled here
        // This in fact reduces to just java.io.IOException.
        reportException(e);
    }
}

If no catch block matches the type of the thrown exception, the execution of the outer block (or method) containing the try-catch statement is discontinued, and the exception is passed up and outside the containing block (or method). The exception is propagated upwards through the call stack until a matching catch block is found within one of the currently active methods. If the exception propagates all the way up to the top-most main method without a matching catch block being found, a textual description of the exception is written to the standard output stream.

The statements within the finally block are always executed after the try and catch blocks, whether or not an exception was thrown and even if a return statement was reached. Such blocks are useful for providing cleanup code that is guaranteed to always be executed.

The catch and finally blocks are optional, but at least one or the other must be present following the try block.

==== try-with-resources statements ====
try-with-resources statements are a special type of try-catch-finally statements introduced as an implementation of the dispose pattern in Java SE 7. In a try-with-resources statement the try keyword is followed by initialization of one or more resources that are released automatically when the try block execution is finished. Resources must implement java.lang.AutoCloesable. try-with-resources statements are not required to have a catch or finally block unlike normal try-catch-finally statements.

import java.beans.XMLEncoder;
import java.io.FileOutputStream;
import java.io.IOException;
import java.util.logging.Level;
import java.util.logging.Logger;

try (FileOutputStream fos = new FileOutputStream("filename");
    XMLEncoder xEnc = new XMLEncoder(fos)) {
    xEnc.writeObject(object);
} catch (IOException e) {
    Logger.getLogger(Serializer.class.getName()).log(Level.SEVERE, null, e);
}

Since Java 9 it is possible to use already declared variables:

import java.beans.XMLEncoder;
import java.io.FileOutputStream;
import java.io.IOException;
import java.util.logging.Level;
import java.util.logging.Logger;

FileOutputStream fos = new FileOutputStream("filename");
XMLEncoder xEnc = new XMLEncoder(fos);
try (fos; xEnc) {
    xEnc.writeObject(object);
} catch (IOException e) {
    Logger.getLogger(Serializer.class.getName()).log(Level.SEVERE, null, e);
}

==== throw statement ====
The throw statement is used to throw an exception and end the execution of the block or method. The thrown exception instance is written after the throw statement.

void methodThrowingExceptions(Object obj) {
    if (obj == null) {
        // Throws exception of NullPointerException type
        throw new NullPointerException();
    }
    // Will not be called, if object is null
    doSomethingWithObject(obj);
}

=== assert statement ===
assert statements have been available since J2SE 1.4. These types of statements are used to make assertions in the source code, which can be turned on and off during execution for specific classes or packages. To declare an assertion the assert keyword is used followed by a conditional expression. If it evaluates to false when the statement is executed, an error java.lang.AssertionError. This statement can include a colon followed by another expression, which will act as the error's detail message.

// If n equals 0, java.lang.AssertionError is thrown
assert n != 0;
/* If n equals 0, java.lang.AssertionError will be thrown
with the message after the colon */
assert n != 0 : "n was equal to zero";

== Threading ==
Java offers threads of execution through the class java.lang.Thread. This class takes a java.lang.Runnable (such as a lambda), and are started using the start() method, and paused/blocked using sleep(). For notifying other threads, wait() releases the object lock and pauses the thread until another thread calls notify() or notifyAll().

Thread t = new Thread(() -> {
    IO.println("Running");
});

t.start();

Daemon threads are threads which run in the background, for example garbage collectors or monitoring threads. The JVM exits when only daemon threads remain.

The current thread may be accessed with the currentThread() method.

Historically, an error java.lang.ThreadDeath would be thrown upon calling stop() on a thread, however stop() was removed since Java 20, and this error is no longer thrown. The idiomatic way to stop a thread now is with the interrupt() method, where a thread is allowed to finish gracefully rather than immediately stopped without cleanup.

=== Thread concurrency control ===
Java has built-in tools for multi-thread programming. For the purposes of thread synchronization the synchronized statement is included in Java language.

To make a code block synchronized, it is preceded by the synchronized keyword followed by the lock object inside the brackets. When the executing thread reaches the synchronized block, it acquires a mutual exclusion lock, executes the block, then releases the lock. No threads may enter this block until the lock is released. Any non-null reference type may be used as the lock.

/* Acquires lock on someObject. It must be of
a reference type and must be non-null */
synchronized (someObject) {
    // Synchronized statements
}

=== Concurrency features ===
Java offers the library java.lang.concurrent, as well as atomicity features (java.util.concurrent.atomic) and locking features (java.util.concurrent.locks).

Rather than java.lang.Thread, another class java.util.concurrent.CompletableFuture is provided for asynchronous computation; this may be seen as similar to a System.Threading.Tasks.Task<T> in C#, even though Java lacks explicit coroutines like those of C#.

As part of Project Loom in Java 21, virtual threads were introduced, which allow for normal, blocking, synchronous code while scaling to millions of tasks. The classic Java thread is called a "platform thread", corresponding roughly to an OS thread, but Java virtual threads are lightweight and managed by the JVM, scheduled onto a small pool of real OS threads. Virtual threads are still java.lang.Thread, but are created with factory methods like ofVirtual(). Although the code is still synchronous and blocking, the physical OS threads are asynchronous; upon stopping to wait, the JVM detaches the code from the physical thread, running other tasks until the OS sends an asynchronous event notification to pick up the code where it left off to finish.

== Primitive types ==
Primitive types in Java include integer types, floating-point numbers, UTF-16 code units and a Boolean type. Unlike C++ and C#, there are no unsigned types in Java except char type, which is used to represent UTF-16 code units. The lack of unsigned types is offset by introducing unsigned right shift operation (>>>), which is not present in C++, methods such as .toUnsignedInt(). Nevertheless, criticisms have been leveled about the lack of compatibility with C and C++ this causes. Each are associated with a wrapper class, which is a reference type, and are automatically boxed in and out of them by the language.

Primitive types
Type name	Class Library equivalent	JVM letter	Value	Range	Size	Default value
short	java.lang.Short	S	integer	−32,768 through +32,767	16-bit (2-byte)	0
int	java.lang.Integer	I	integer	−2,147,483,648 through +2,147,483,647	32-bit (4-byte)	0
long	java.lang.Long	J	integer	−9,223,372,036,854,775,808 through +9,223,372,036,854,775,807	64-bit (8-byte)	0
byte	java.lang.Byte	B	integer	-128 through 127	8-bit (1-byte)	0
float	java.lang.Float	F	floating point number	±1.401298E−45 through ±3.402823E+38	32-bit (4-byte)	0.0
double	java.lang.Double	D	floating point number	±4.94065645841246E−324 through ±1.79769313486232E+308	64-bit (8-byte)	0.0
boolean	java.lang.Boolean	Z	Boolean	true or false	8-bit (1-byte)	false
char	java.lang.Character	C	single Unicode character	'\u0000' through '\uFFFF'	16-bit (2-byte)	'\u0000'
void	java.lang.Void	V	N/A	N/A	N/A	N/A

null has no type, neither primitive nor class. Any object type may store null.

The class java.lang.Void is used to hold a reference to the java.lang.Class object representing the keyword void. It cannot be instantiated as void cannot be the type of any object. For example, CompletableFuture<Void> signifies that a java.util.concurrent.CompletableFuture<T> performs a task that does not return a value.

The class java.lang.Number represents all numeric values which can be converted to byte, double, float, int, long, and short.

char does not necessarily correspond to a single character. It may represent a part of a surrogate pair, in which case Unicode code point is represented by a sequence of two char values.

The wrapper classes contain additional static methods for operations on their primitive types, such as Integer.parseInt(), as well as static constants describing the type's information. The wrapper class java.lang.Character itself contains additional nested types:

- java.lang.Character.Subset, representing a subset of the Unicode character set
- java.lang.Character.UnicodeBlock, containing constants representing a Unicode block
- java.lang.Character.UnicodeScript, an enum of scripts in Unicode

=== Boxing and unboxing ===
This language feature was introduced in J2SE 5.0. Boxing is the operation of converting a value of a primitive type into a value of a corresponding reference type, which serves as a wrapper for this particular primitive type. Unboxing is the reverse operation of converting a value of a reference type (previously boxed) into a value of a corresponding primitive type. Neither operation requires an explicit conversion.

Example:

int foo = 42; // Primitive type
Integer bar = foo; /* foo is boxed to bar, bar is of Integer type,
                      which serves as a wrapper for int */
int foo2 = bar; // Unboxed back to primitive type

== Reference types ==
Reference types include class types, interface types, and array types. When the constructor is called, an object is created on the heap and a reference is assigned to the variable. When a variable of an object gets out of scope, the reference is broken and when there are no references left, the object gets marked as garbage. The garbage collector then collects and destroys it some time afterwards.

A reference variable is null when it does not reference any object.

=== Arrays ===
Arrays in Java are created at runtime, just like class instances. Array length is defined at creation and cannot be changed.

int[] numbers = new int[5];
numbers[0] = 2;
numbers[1] = 5;
int x = numbers[0];
int len = numbers.length; // len = 5

C-style declarations of arrays are also accepted in Java, but are not commonly used.

int arr[] = new int[10];

Arrays are represented in the JVM with an opening left squared bracket for every dimension of the array, with the following letters:

- B, for byte
- C, for char
- D, for double
- F, for float
- I, for int
- J, for long
- S, for short
- Z, for boolean
- L, for any reference (non-primitive) type, followed by the fully qualified class name and then a closing semicolon (Note: Note that in class files, the dots appear as slashes. For example, Object[] becomes [Ljava/lang/Object;)

For example, int[][] becomes [[I and String[] becomes [Ljava.lang.String;.

void does not exist as a type in memory, but it is represented internally with the letter V.

Arrays are limited to a maximum of 255 dimensions. The theoretical maximum length of an array is $2^{31} - 1$ (2,147,483,647, equivalent to Integer.MAX_VALUE), because arrays can only be addressed with 32-bit indices, but this limit is typically system and virtual machine dependent.

The classes java.util.Arrays and java.lang.reflect.Array are provided for array manipulation and reflective operations on arrays, respectively.

Arrays appear to have a field length, but it is not a real field; it is a built-in property evaluated natively by the arraylength bytecode instruction. Arrays have no declared members, methods or constructors (other than those inherited from java.lang.Object).

Arrays inherit the class java.lang.Object and implement the interfaces java.lang.Cloneable and java.io.Serializable. Although they can be iterated in a for-each loop, they do not implement java.lang.Iterable. Arrays are implicitly final, and cannot be inherited from. Despite being classes, there are no .class file for arrays because they are created directly in memory during execution, have no physical bytecode representation, and are not loaded by a class loader.

Because arrays are reference types, they may be used directly in generic type parameters.

import java.util.ArrayList;
import java.util.List;

List<int[]> frequencies = new ArrayList<>();

==== Initializers ====
// Long syntax
int[] numbers = new int[] {20, 1, 42, 15, 34};
// Short syntax
int[] numbers2 = {20, 1, 42, 15, 34};

==== Multi-dimensional arrays ====
In Java, multi-dimensional arrays are represented as arrays of arrays. Technically, they are represented by arrays of references to other arrays.

int[][] numbers = new int[3][3];
numbers[1][2] = 2;

int[][] numbers2 = {{2, 3, 2}, {1, 2, 6}, {2, 4, 5}};

Due to the nature of the multi-dimensional arrays, sub-arrays can vary in length, so multi-dimensional arrays are not bound to be rectangular unlike C:

int[][] numbers = new int[2][]; // Initialization of the first dimension only

numbers[0] = new int[3];
numbers[1] = new int[2];

=== Classes ===
Classes are fundamentals of an object-oriented language such as Java. They contain members that store and manipulate data. Classes are divided into top-level and nested. Nested classes are classes placed inside another class that may access the private members of the enclosing class. Nested classes include member classes (which may be defined with the static modifier for simple nesting or without it for inner classes), local classes and anonymous classes.

==== Declaration ====
Top-level class	class Foo {     // Class members }
Inner class	// Top-level class class Foo {     // Inner class     class Bar {         // ...     } }
Nested class	// Top-level class class Foo {     // Nested class     static class Bar {         // ...     } }
Local class	class Foo {     void bar() {         // Local class within a method         class Foobar {             // ...         }     } }
Anonymous class	class Foo {     void bar() {         // Creation of a new anonymous class extending Object         new Object() {};     } }

==== Instantiation ====
Non-static members of a class define the types of the instance variables and methods, which are related to the objects created from that class. To create these objects, the class must be instantiated by using the new operator and calling the class constructor.

Foo foo = new Foo();

==== Accessing members ====
Members of both instances and static classes are accessed with the . (dot) operator.

Accessing an instance member
Instance members can be accessed through the name of a variable.

String foo = "Hello";
String bar = foo.toUpperCase();

Accessing a static class member
Static members are accessed by using the name of the class or any other type. This does not require the creation of a class instance. Static members are declared using the static modifier.

public class Foo {
    public static void doSomething() {
        // ...
    }
}

// Calling the static method
Foo.doSomething();

==== Modifiers ====
Modifiers are keywords used to modify declarations of types and type members. Most notably there is a sub-group containing the access modifiers.

- abstract - Specifies that a class only serves as a base class and cannot be instantiated.
- static - Used only for member classes, specifies that the member class does not belong to a specific instance of the containing class.
- final - Classes marked as final cannot be extended from and cannot have any subclasses.
- strictfp - Specifies that all floating-point operations must be carried out conforming to IEEE 754 and forbids using enhanced precision to store intermediate results.

===== Abstract class =====
By default, all methods in all classes are concrete, unless the abstract keyword is used. An abstract class may include abstract methods, which have no implementation. By default, all methods in all interfaces are abstract, unless the default keyword is used. The default keyword can be used to specify a concrete method in an interface.

// By default, all methods in all classes are concrete, unless the abstract keyword is used.
abstract class Demo {
    // An abstract class may include abstract methods, which have no implementation.
    public abstract int sum(int x, int y);

    // An abstract class may also include concrete methods.
    public int product(int x, int y) { 
        return x * y; 
    }
}

// By default, all methods in all interfaces are abstract, unless the default keyword is used.
interface DemoInterface {
    int getLength(); // The abstract keyword can be used here, though is completely useless
    
    // The default keyword can be used in this context to specify a concrete method in an interface
    default int product(int x, int y) {
        return x * y;
    }
}

===== Final class =====
A final class cannot be subclassed. As doing this can confer security and efficiency benefits, many of the Java standard library classes are final, such as java.lang.System and java.lang.String.

Example:

final class Final {
    // ...
}

// Forbidden
class Derived extends Final {
    // ...
}

===== Access modifiers =====
The access modifiers, or inheritance modifiers, set the accessibility of classes, methods, and other members. Members marked as public can be reached from anywhere. If a class or its member does not have any modifiers, default access is assumed.

public class Foo {
    int baz() {
        return 0;
    }

    private class Bar {

    }
}

The following table shows whether code within a class has access to the class or method depending on the accessing class location and the modifier for the accessed class or class member:

Modifier	Same class or nested class	Other class inside the same package	Extended Class inside another package	Non-extended inside another package
private	yes	no	no	no
default (package private)	yes	yes	no	no
protected	yes	yes	yes	no
public	yes	yes	yes	yes

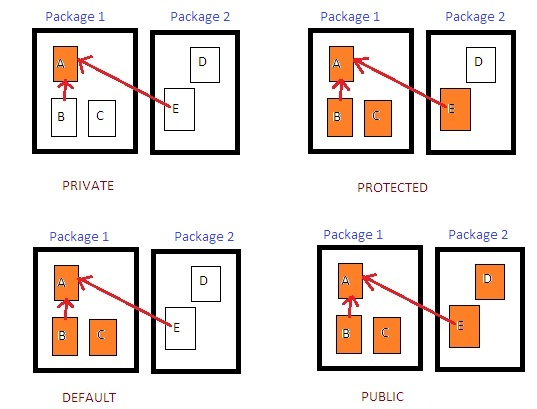
This image describes the class member scope within classes and packages.

==== Constructors and initializers ====
A constructor is a special method-like block called when an object is initialized. Its purpose is to initialize the members of the object. The main differences between constructors and ordinary methods are that constructors are called only when an instance of the class is created and never return anything. Constructors are declared in such a way that resembles a method, but they are named after the class and no return type is specified; for a class X, a constructor is X(...); in particular, a default constructor has no parameters, X().

class Foo {
    String str;

    // Constructor with no arguments
    Foo() {}

    // Constructor with one argument
    Foo(String str) {
        this.str = str;
    }
}

A constructor appears to resemble a method, but are in fact instance initialization blocks, and cannot be invoked directly by a method call (unlike in C++, where constructors are considered special member functions). Despite this, in the JVM bytecode, a constructor appears under the name <init> and is called an "instance initialization method", and are marked void (and therefore do not push any resulting object onto the JVM's operand stack upon completing execution).

Initializers are blocks of code that are executed when a class or an instance of a class is created. There are two kinds of initializers, static initializers and instance initializers.

Static initializers initialize static fields when the class is created. They are declared using the static keyword:

class Foo {
    static {
        // Initialization
    }
}

A class is created only once. Therefore, static initializers are not called more than once. On the contrary, instance initializers are automatically called before the call to a constructor every time an instance of the class is created. Unlike constructors instance initializers cannot take any arguments and generally they cannot throw any checked exceptions (except in several special cases). Instance initializers are declared in a block without any keywords:

class Foo {
    {
        // Initialization
    }
}

Since Java relies on a garbage collection mechanism, there are no destructors ~X() or delete operator. However, every object has a finalize() method called prior to garbage collection, which can be overridden to implement finalization; however, this method has been deprecated since Java 9. However, there are no guarantees which thread will invoke the finalize() method for any given object, or even that it will be invoked at all. Finalizers are non-deterministic (unlike destructors in C++), and releasing critical resources in a finalize() call may lead to unpredictable behavior. Another class, java.lang.ref.Cleaner, introduced in Java 9, is additionally provided for lower-level safety nets for reclaiming non-memory resources, such as native pointers, file descriptors, or sockets.

==== Methods ====
All the statements in Java must reside within methods. Methods are similar to functions except they belong to classes. A method has a return value, a name and usually some parameters initialized when it is called with some arguments. Similar to C++, methods returning nothing have return type declared as void. Unlike in C++, methods in Java are not allowed to have default argument values and methods are usually overloaded instead.

class Foo {
    int bar(int a, int b) {
        return (a * 2) + b;
    }

    // Overloaded method with the same name but different set of arguments
    int bar(int a) {
        return a * 2;
    }
}

A method is called using . notation on an object, or in the case of a static method, also on the name of a class.

Foo foo = new Foo();
int result = foo.bar(7, 2); // Non-static method is called on foo

int finalResult = Math.abs(result); // Static method call

The throws keyword indicates that a method throws an exception. All checked exceptions must be listed in a comma-separated list.

import java.io.File;
import java.io.IOException;
import java.util.zip.DataFormatException;

// Indicates that IOException and DataFormatException may be thrown
void operateOnFile(File f) throws IOException, DataFormatException {
    // ...
}

===== Modifiers =====
- abstract - Abstract methods can be present only in abstract classes, such methods have no body and must be overridden in a subclass unless it is abstract itself.
- static - Makes the method static and accessible without creation of a class instance. However static methods cannot access non-static members in the same class.
- final - Declares that the method cannot be overridden in a subclass.
- native - Indicates that this method is implemented through JNI in platform-dependent code. Actual implementation happens outside Java code, and such methods have no body.
- strictfp - Declares strict conformance to IEEE 754 in carrying out floating-point operations. Now obsolete.
- synchronized - Declares that a thread executing this method must acquire monitor. For synchronized methods the monitor is the class instance or java.lang.Class if the method is static.
- Access modifiers - Identical to those used with classes.

====== Final methods ======
A final method cannot be overridden or hidden by subclasses. This is used to prevent unexpected behavior from a subclass altering a method that may be crucial to the function or consistency of the class.

Example:

public class Base {
    public void foo() {
        // ...
    }

    public final void bar() {
        // ...
    }

    public static void baz() { 
        // ...
    }

    public static final void qux() {
        // ...
    }
}

public class Derived extends Base {
    // OK, overriding Base::foo()
    @Override
    public void foo() {
        // ...
    }

    // forbidden
    @Override
    public void bar() {
        // ...
    }

    // OK, overriding Base::baz()
    @Override
    public static void baz() {
        // ...
    }

    // forbidden
    @Override
    public static void qux() {
        // ...
    }
}

A common misconception is that declaring a method as final improves efficiency by allowing the compiler to directly insert the method wherever it is called (see inline expansion). Because the method is loaded at runtime, compilers are unable to do this. Only the runtime environment and JIT compiler know exactly which classes have been loaded, and so only they are able to make decisions about when to inline, whether or not the method is final.

Machine code compilers that generate directly executable, platform-specific machine code, are an exception. When using static linking, the compiler can safely assume that methods and variables computable at compile-time may be inlined.

===== Variadic parameters =====
This language feature was introduced in J2SE 5.0. The last argument of the method may be declared as a variable arity parameter, in which case the method becomes a variable arity method (as opposed to fixed arity methods) or simply variadic method. This allows one to pass a (possibly zero) variable number of values, of the declared type, to the method as parameters. These values will be available inside the method as an array.

// numbers represents varargs
void printReport(String header, int... numbers) {
    // numbers appears as int[]
    IO.println(header);
    for (int num : numbers) {
        IO.println(num);
    }
}

// Calling varargs method
printReport("Report data", 74, 83, 25, 96);

==== Fields ====
Fields, or class variables, can be declared inside the class body to store data.

class Foo {
    double bar;
}

Fields can be initialized directly when declared.

class Foo {
    double bar = 2.3;
}

===== Modifiers =====
- static - Makes the field a static member.
- final - Allows the field to be initialized only once in a constructor or inside initialization block or during its declaration, whichever is earlier.
- transient - Indicates that this field will not be stored during serialization.
- volatile - If a field is declared volatile, it is ensured that all threads see a consistent value for the variable.

==== Inheritance ====
Classes in Java can only inherit from one class. A class can be derived from any class that is not marked as final. Inheritance is declared using the extends keyword. A class can reference itself using the this keyword and its direct superclass using the super keyword.

class Foo {

}

class Foobar extends Foo {

}

If a class does not specify its superclass, it implicitly inherits from java.lang.Object class. Thus all classes in Java are subclasses of java.lang.Object class.

If the superclass does not have a constructor without parameters the subclass must specify in its constructors what constructor of the superclass to use. For example:

class Foo {
    public Foo(int n) {
        // Do something with n
    }
}

class Foobar extends Foo {
    private int number;
    // Superclass does not have constructor without parameters
    // so we have to specify what constructor of our superclass to use and how

    public Foobar(int number) {
        super(number);
        this.number = number;
    }
}

===== Overriding methods =====
Unlike C++, all non-final methods in Java are virtual and can be overridden by the inheriting classes.

class Operation {
    public int doSomething() {
        return 0;
    }
}

class NewOperation extends Operation {
    @Override
    public int doSomething() {
        return 1;
    }
}

===== Abstract classes =====
An abstract class is a class that is incomplete, or is to be considered incomplete, and cannot be instantiated (directly).

A class X has abstract methods if any of the following is true:

- X explicitly contains a declaration of an abstract method.
- Any of X's superclasses in the inheritance chain have an abstract method and X neither declares nor inherits a method that implements it.
- A direct superinterface of X declares or inherits a method (which is therefore necessarily abstract) and X neither declares nor inherits a method that implements it.
- A subclass of an abstract class that is not itself abstract may be instantiated, resulting in the execution of a constructor for the abstract class and, therefore, the execution of the field initializers for instance variables of that class.

package org.wikipedia.examples;

public class MyAbstractClass {
    private static final String hello;

    static {
        System.out.printf("%s: static block runtime%n", MyAbstractClass.class.getName());
        hello = String.format("hello from %s", MyAbstractClass.class.getName());
    }

    {
        System.out.printf("%s: instance block runtime%n", MyAbstractClass.class.getName());
    }

    public AbstractClass() {
        System.out.printf("%s: constructor runtime%n", MyAbstractClass.class.getName());
    }

    public static void hello() {
        IO.println(hello);
    }
}

package org.wikipedia.examples;

public class MyCustomClass extends MyAbstractClass {

    static {
        System.out.printf("%s: static block runtime%n", MyCustomClass.class.getName());
    }

    {
        System.out.printf("%s: instance block runtime%n", MyCustomClass.class.getName());
    }

    public CustomClass() {
        System.out.printf("%s: constructor runtime%n", MyCustomClass.class.getName());
    }

    public static void main(String[] args) {
        MyCustomClass nc = new MyCustomClass();
        hello();
        MyAbstractClass.hello(); // also valid
    }
}

Output:

org.wikipedia.examples.MyAbstractClass: static block runtime
org.wikipedia.examples.MyCustomClass: static block runtime
org.wikipedia.examples.MyAbstractClass: instance block runtime
org.wikipedia.examples.MyAbstractClass: constructor runtime
org.wikipedia.examples.MyCustomClass: instance block runtime
org.wikipedia.examples.MyCustomClass: constructor runtime
hello from org.wikipedia.examples.MyAbstractClass

==== Enumerations ====
This language feature was introduced in J2SE 5.0. Technically enumerations are a kind of class containing enum constants in its body. Each enum constant defines an instance of the enum type. Enumeration classes cannot be instantiated anywhere except in the enumeration class itself.

enum Season {
    WINTER,
    SPRING,
    SUMMER,
    AUTUMN,
}

Enum constants are allowed to have constructors, which are called when the class is loaded:

public enum Season {
    WINTER("Cold"),
    SPRING("Warmer"),
    SUMMER("Hot"),
    AUTUMN("Cooler");

    Season(String description) {
        this.description = description;
    }

    private final String description;

    public String getDescription() {
        return description;
    }
}

Enumerations can have class bodies, in which case they are treated like anonymous classes extending the enum class:

public enum Season {
    WINTER {
        @Override
        String getDescription() {
            return "cold"
        }
    },
    SPRING {
        @Override
        String getDescription() {
            return "warmer";
        }
    },
    SUMMER {
        @Override
        String getDescription() {
            return "hot";
        }
    },
    FALL {
        @Override
        String getDescription() {
            return "cooler";
        }
    };

    abstract String getDescription();
}

=== Interfaces ===
Interfaces are types which contain no fields and usually define a number of methods without an actual implementation. They are useful to define a contract with any number of different implementations. Every interface is implicitly abstract. Interface methods are allowed to have a subset of access modifiers depending on the language version, strictfp, which has the same effect as for classes, and also static since Java SE 8.

interface ActionListener {
    int ACTION_ADD = 0;
    int ACTION_REMOVE = 1;
 
    void actionSelected(int action);
}

==== Implementing an interface ====
An interface is implemented by a class using the implements keyword. It is allowed to implement more than one interface, in which case they are written after implements keyword in a comma-separated list. A class implementing an interface must override all its methods, otherwise it must be declared as abstract.

interface RequestListener {
    int requestReceived();
}

class ActionHandler implements ActionListener, RequestListener {
    public void actionSelected(int action) {
        // ...
    }

    public int requestReceived() {
        // ...
    }
}

// Calling method defined by interface
// ActionHandler can be represented as RequestListener...
RequestListener listener = new ActionHandler(); 
// ...and thus is known to implement requestReceived() method
listener.requestReceived();

==== Functional interfaces and lambda expressions ====
These features were introduced with the release of Java SE 8. An interface automatically becomes a functional interface if it defines only one method (excluding those which are inherited from java.lang.Object). In this case an implementation can be represented as a lambda expression instead of implementing it in a new class, thus greatly simplifying writing code in the functional style. Functional interfaces can optionally be annotated with the java.lang.FunctionalInterface annotation, which will tell the compiler to check whether the interface actually conforms to a definition of a functional interface.

// A functional interface
@FunctionalInterface
interface Calculation {
    int calculate(int someNumber, int someOtherNumber);
}

// A method which accepts this interface as a parameter
int runCalculation(Calculation calculation) {
    return calculation.calculate(1, 2);
}

// Using a lambda to call the method
runCalculation((number, otherNumber) -> number + otherNumber);

// Equivalent code which uses an anonymous class instead
runCalculation(new Calculation() {
    @Override
    public int calculate(int someNumber, int someOtherNumber) {
        return someNumber + someOtherNumber;
    }
})

The parameter types of a lambda do not have to be fully specified and can be inferred from the interface it implements, but there is no place to explicitly specify the lambda's return type (which is inferred). The body of the lambda can be written without a body block and a return statement if it is only an expression. Also, for those interfaces which only have a single parameter in the method, round brackets can be omitted.

// Same call as above, but with fully specified types and a body block
runCalculation((int number, int otherNumber) -> {
    return number + otherNumber;
});

// A functional interface with a method which has only a single parameter
interface StringExtender {
    String extendString(String input);
}

// Initializing a variable of this type by using a lambda
StringExtender extender = input -> input + " Extended";

Lambdas cannot specify throws clauses. Lambdas implement some target functional interface (such as java.lang.Runnable, etc.). Lambdas themselves are not complete expressions of concrete types, but rather poly expressions, whose type are influenced by their surrounding target type rather than entirely by their own content.

import java.util.function.Function;

// Invalid, as lambda expressions themselves have no standalone type
var f = (int x) -> x + 1;
// Should instead be:
Function<Integer, Integer> f = x -> x + 1;

If a lambda implements a functional interface which extends java.io.Serializable, then when the lambda is serialized, it becomes a java.lang.invoke.SerializedLambda, capturing information about the lambda itself, called its "serialized form". This is necessary, because lambda implementation classes are synthetic and JVM-specific, and must therefore be reconstructed exactly in another JVM invocation. Much like in C++, lambda type names are synthetic and compiler-generated with unspecified implementation details.

Runnable r = () -> IO.println("Hello");

// Could print something like:
// class org.wikipedia.examples.Main$$Lambda$1/0x0000000800b00440
IO.println(r.getClass());

Lambdas do not generate class files, but rather emit an invokedynamic instruction on the JVM, which the runtime uses to create a suitable implementation class.

Capturing lambdas are typically distinct objects, due to requiring stored captured state, however non-capturing lambdas may potentially be singleton.

Runnable r1 = () -> {};
Runnable r2 = () -> {};

IO.println(r1 == r2); // May print true or false; determined by the JVM

However, unlike C++, lambda types are not part of the language model; nothing about its runtime class may be depended upon, whereas in C++ the lambda type may still be extracted with decltype to obtain a real unique closure type; a lambda's java.lang.Class<?> cannot be referenced in code.

==== Method references ====
Java allows method references using the operator :: (it is not related to the C++ namespace qualifying operator ::). It is not necessary to use lambdas when there already is a named method compatible with the interface. This method can be passed instead of a lambda using a method reference. There are several types of method references:

Reference type	Example	Equivalent lambda
Static	Integer::sum	(m, n) -> m + n
Bound	"LongString"::substring	i -> "LongString".substring(i)
Unbound	String::isEmpty	s -> s.isEmpty()
Class constructor	ArrayList<String>::new	len -> new ArrayList<String>(len)
Array constructor	String[]::new	len -> new String[len]

The code above which calls runCalculation could be replaced with the following using the method references:

runCalculation(Integer::sum);

Note that in Java, constructors are not considered methods, and thus X::X does not exist; a constructor reference is retrieved with X::new.

==== Inheritance ====
Interfaces can inherit from other interfaces just like classes. Unlike classes it is allowed to inherit from multiple interfaces. However, it is possible that several interfaces have a field with the same name, in which case it becomes a single ambiguous member, which cannot be accessed.

/* Class implementing this interface must implement methods of both
ActionListener and RequestListener */
interface EventListener extends ActionListener, RequestListener {    
}

==== Default methods ====
Java SE 8 introduced default methods to interfaces which allows developers to add new methods to existing interfaces without breaking compatibility with the classes already implementing the interface. Unlike regular interface methods, default methods have a body which will get called in the case if the implementing class does not override it.

interface StringManipulator {
    String extendString(String input);
    
    // A method which is optional to implement
    default String shortenString(String input) {
        return input.substring(1);
    }
}

// This is a valid class despite not implementing all the methods
class PartialStringManipulator implements StringManipulator {
    @Override
    public String extendString(String input) {
        return String.format("%s Extended", input);
    }
}

==== Static methods ====
Static methods is another language feature introduced in Java SE 8. They behave in exactly the same way as in the classes.

interface StringUtils {
    static String shortenByOneSymbol(String input) {
        return input.substring(1);
    }
}

StringUtils.shortenByOneSymbol("Test");

==== Private methods ====
Private methods were added in the Java 9 release. An interface can have a method with a body marked as private, in which case it will not be visible to inheriting classes. It can be called from default methods for the purposes of code reuse.

interface Logger {
    default void logError() {
        log(Level.ERROR);
    }

    default void logInfo() {
        log(Level.INFO);
    }

    private void log(Level level) {
        SystemLogger.log(level.id);
    }
}

==== Annotations ====
Annotations in Java are a way to embed metadata into code. This language feature was introduced in J2SE 5.0.

===== Annotation types =====
Java has a set of predefined annotation types, but it is allowed to define new ones. An annotation type declaration is a special type of an interface declaration. They are declared in the same way as the interfaces, except the interface keyword is preceded by the @ sign. Java annotations are interfaces and are implicitly extended from java.lang.annotation.Annotation and cannot be extended from anything else. Unlike C++ annotations, which may be any object, Java annotations cannot be instantiated into a real runtime object.

@interface BlockingOperations {

}

Annotations may have the same declarations in the body as the common interfaces, in addition they are allowed to include enums and annotations. The main difference is that abstract method declarations must not have any parameters or throw any exceptions. Also they may have a default value, which is declared using the default keyword after the method name:

@interface BlockingOperations {
    boolean fileSystemOperations();
    boolean networkOperations() default false;
}

===== Usage of annotations =====
Annotations may be used in any kind of declaration, whether it is package, class (including enums), interface (including annotations), field, method, parameter, constructor, or local variable. Also they can be used with enum constants. Annotations are declared using the @ sign preceding annotation type name, after which element-value pairs are written inside brackets. All elements with no default value must be assigned a value.

@BlockingOperations(
    fileSystemOperations, // mandatory
    networkOperations = true // optional
)
void openOutputStream() { 
    // annotated method
}

Besides the generic form, there are two other forms to declare an annotation, which are shorthands. Marker annotation is a short form, it is used when no values are assigned to elements:

@Unused // Shorthand for @Unused()
void travelToJupiter() {

}

The other short form is called single element annotation. It is used with annotations types containing only one element or in the case when multiple elements are present, but only one elements lacks a default value. In single element annotation form the element name is omitted and only value is written instead:

/* 
Equivalent for @BlockingOperations(fileSystemOperations = true).
networkOperations has a default value and
does not have to be assigned a value 
*/

@BlockingOperations(true)
void openOutputStream() {

}

== Generics ==
Generic programming (generics), or parameterized types, or parametric polymorphism, is one of the major features introduced in J2SE 5.0. Before generics were introduced, it was required to declare all the types explicitly. With generics, it became possible to work in a similar manner with different types without declaring the exact types. The main purpose of generics is to ensure type safety and to detect runtime errors during compilation. Unlike C++ templates, generics do not instantiate a specialization for each type, and unlike C#, generics are not reified, and information on the used parameters is not available at runtime due to type erasure (while Kotlin, another JVM language, offers reified generics, it achieves this by inlining the type at the call site). This is because historically, Java lacked generics entirely; thus generics are erased at runtime to allow a generic class X<T> to be compatible with X.

For instance, before generics were introduced, the Java collections framework stored everything as java.lang.Object.

import java.util.ArrayList;
import java.util.List;

List names = new ArrayList();
names.add("Alice");
names.add("Bob");
String first = (String)names.get(0); // first = "Alice"
names.add(1); // Allowed

At runtime, generics appear as the lower bound of the type parameter (if no lower bound is specified, this is implicitly java.lang.Object). Because generics are erased, it is not possible to construct a generic type (such as new T()) or check types against a specialization (such as if (names instanceof List<String>)).

Also, generic classes may not extend java.lang.Throwable. This is because a generic exception FooException<T> would erase FooException<String> and FooException<Integer> to the same type at runtime, making the two indistinguishable at runtime. This is unlike C++, where templates have invariant type identity, thus making FooException<int> and FooException<string> different types. However, a generic type may be thrown (as long as it is bounded below by java.lang.Throwable). For example, the following pattern, sometimes known as the generic rethrow or sneaky throw, is used to bypass checked exceptions entirely, such as in the Project Lombok @SneakyThrows attribute.

static <T extends Throwable> void sneakyThrow(Throwable t) throws T {
    throw (T) t;
}

This erases T down to java.lang.Throwable, bypassing the checked exception mechanism (which enforces only on types which do not descend from java.lang.Error or java.lang.RuntimeException) entirely.

=== Generic classes ===
Classes can be parameterized by adding a type parameter inside angle brackets (< and >) following the class name. It makes possible the use of this type parameter in class members instead of actual types. There can be more than one type parameter, in which case they are declared in a comma-separated list. However, these type parameters are erased at runtime; for example, Foo<X> and Foo<Y> will both be erased down to Foo, and are indistinguishable at runtime.

It is possible to limit a type parameter to a subtype of some specific class or declare an interface that must be implemented by the type. In this case the type parameter is appended by the extends keyword followed by a name of the class or the interface. If the type parameter is constrained by both class and interface or if there are several interfaces, the class name is written first, followed by interface names with & sign used as the delimiter (in a way which resembles an intersection type).

import java.util.ArrayList;
import java.util.Formattable;

/* This class has two type parameters, T and V. T must be 
a subtype of ArrayList and implement Formattable interface */
public class Mapper<T extends ArrayList & Formattable, V> {
    public void add(T array, V item) {
        // array has add method because it is an ArrayList subclass
        array.add(item);
    }
}

When a type parameter of a parameterized type is declared or an instance is created, its type is written exactly in the same format as in the class header, except the actual type is written in the place of the type parameter declaration.

/* Mapper is created with CustomList as T and Integer as V.
CustomList must be a subclass of ArrayList and implement Formattable */
Mapper<CustomList, Integer> mapper = new Mapper<CustomList, Integer>();

Since Java SE 7, it is possible to use an empty type list, <> (sometimes called a "diamond"), in place of type arguments, in which case the latter will be inferred. This is sometimes called the "diamond operator", even though it is not actually an operator, but rather an empty type list. The following code in Java SE 7 is equivalent to the code in the previous example:

Mapper<CustomList, Integer> mapper = new Mapper<>();

When declaring a type parameter for a parameterized type, it is possible to use wildcards instead of explicit type names. Wildcards are expressed by writing ? sign instead of the actual type. It is possible to limit possible types to the subclasses or superclasses of some specific class by writing the extends keyword or the super keyword correspondingly followed by the class name.

/* Any Mapper instance with CustomList as the first parameter
may be used regardless of the second one.*/
Mapper<CustomList, ?> mapper;
mapper = new Mapper<CustomList, Boolean>();
mapper = new Mapper<CustomList, Integer>();

/* Will not accept types that use anything but
a subclass of Number as the second parameter */
void addMapper(Mapper<?, ? extends Number> mapper) {
}

=== Generic methods and constructors ===
Usage of generics may be limited to some particular methods, this concept applies to constructors as well. To declare a parameterized method, type variables are written before the return type of the method in the same format as for the generic classes. In the case of constructor, type variables are declared before the constructor name.

class Mapper {
    // The class is not generic, the constructor is
    <T, V> Mapper(T array, V item) {}
}

/* This method will accept only arrays of the same type as
the searched item type or its subtype */
static <T, V extends T> boolean contains(T item, V[] arr) {
    for (T currentItem : arr) {
        if (item.equals(currentItem)) {
            return true;
        }
    }
    return false;
}

=== Generic interfaces ===
Interfaces can be parameterized in the similar manner as the classes.

interface Expandable<T extends Number> {
    void addItem(T item);
}

// This class is parameterized
class MyArray<T extends Number> implements Expandable<T> {
    void addItem(T item) {
    }
}

// And this is not and uses an explicit type instead
class IntegerArray implements Expandable<Integer> {
    void addItem(Integer item) {
    }
}

== See also ==
- Java Platform, Standard Edition
- C# syntax
- C++ syntax
- C syntax
- JavaScript syntax
