= Outline of the Rust programming language =

Overview of and topical guide to Rust

The following outline is provided as an overview of and topical guide to Rust:

Rust is a multi-paradigm programming language emphasizing performance, memory safety, and concurrency. Rust was initially developed by Graydon Hoare starting in 2006, later sponsored and maintained by Mozilla Research starting in 2009, and first publicly released in 2010, with version 1.0 released in 2015. Rust is syntactically similar to C++ but guarantees memory safety without needing a garbage collector.

== What type of language is Rust? ==
- Programming language – artificial language designed to communicate instructions to a computer
- Compiled language – implemented through compilers rather than interpreters
- General-purpose programming language
- Multi-paradigm programming language – supports functional programming, imperative programming, concurrent programming.
- Statically typed programming language – type checking performed at compile time
- Systems programming language – designed for low-level programming and operating system development
- Memory-safe language – prevents common undefined behavior like dangling pointers and buffer overflows

== History of Rust ==
- Graydon Hoare – creator of Rust starting in 2006
- Mozilla – original sponsor and maintainer of Rust starting in 2009
- Cargo (software) – introduced as Rust’s official package manager and build system in 2014
- Rust Foundation – current steward of the Rust project since its inception in 2021

== General Rust concepts ==
- Asynchronous I/O
- Arrays and vectors
- Borrow checker
- Closures
- Concurrency
- Crates and modules
- Enums in Rust
- Error handling
- Functions
- Generics
- If statements and booleans
- Iterators
- Lifetimes
- Macros
- Memory management
- Ownership
- Pattern matching
- Serialization
- Smart pointers
- Strings
- Tuples and structs
- Traits
- Type inference
- Unit testing
- Variables

== Issues, limits ==
- Compile time performance
- Ecosystem maturity

== Rust toolchain ==
=== Compilers ===
- rustc – official Rust compiler
- LLVM – Rust backend uses LLVM for code generation
- mrustc – alternative Rust compiler written in C++
- Cranelift – JIT compiler backend used in Wasmtime

=== Build and package management ===
- Cargo – build system and package manager
- Crates.io – official Rust package registry

=== Rust libraries and frameworks ===
- Rocket – web framework focused on type safety
- Serde – framework for serialization and deserialization supporting JSON, YAML, TOML, and more.
- Tokio – asynchronous runtime for Rust

=== Testing and benchmarking ===
- Criterion.rs – benchmarking library
- Built-in unit testing with Cargo

== Notable projects written in Rust ==
- Firefox (partial, via components)
- Alacritty
- Deno
- TiKV

== Example source code ==
- Articles with example Rust code

== Rust publications ==
=== Books about Rust ===
- Klabnik, Steve; Nichols, Carol; Krycho, Chris (2026). The Rust Programming Language (3rd ed.). No Starch Press. ISBN 978-1-7185-0444-8. OCLC 1591968943.
- The Secrets of Rust: Tools – Bitfield Consulting
- Drysdale, David. Effective Rust: 35 specific ways to improve your Rust code. O'Reilly Media. ISBN 978-1-0981-5137-9. OCLC 1422579583.
- Gjengset, Jon (2022). Rust for Rustaceans: idiomatic programming for experienced developers. No Starch Press. ISBN 978-1-7185-0185-0. OCLC 1289300769.
- Blandy, Jim; Orendorff, Jason; Tindall, Leonora F.S. (2026). Programming Rust: fast, safe systems development (3rd ed.). O'Reilly Media. OCLC 1573515932.
- McNamara, Tim S. (2021). Rust in Action : systems programming concepts and techniques. Manning. ISBN 978-1-61729-455-6. OCLC 1300793337.
- Palmieri, Luca (2022). Zero to Production in Rust: an opinionated introduction to backend development. OCLC 1446252540.

Excerpted from: "The best Rust books for 2025, reviewed". Bitfield Consulting. July 5, 2024.

== Rust dialects and related languages ==
- Dyon – rusty dynamically typed scripting language
- Fe – inspired by Rust, smart contract language for the Ethereum blockchain
- Move – originally developed for the Diem blockchain
- Sway – Rust-based language for smart contracts

== Rust learning resources ==
- Getting started with Rust
- Official Rust Learn page
- W3Schools – Rust tutorials
- The Rust Programming Language (online book)
- Rust By Example

=== Competitive programming ===
- LeetCode – supports Rust submissions
- HackerRank – includes Rust challenges
- Codeforces – supports Rust in contests

== See also ==
- Outline of computer programming
- Outline of software
- Outline of software engineering
- Outline of C++

Outlines of other programming languages

- Outline of the C programming language
- Outline of the C sharp programming language
- Outline of the C++ programming language
- Outline of the Java programming language
- Outline of the JavaScript programming language
- Outline of the Perl programming language
- Outline of the Python programming language
