= Static dispatch =

During compilation, selecting which implementation of a method or function to use

In computing, static dispatch is a form of polymorphism fully resolved during compile time. It is a form of method dispatch, which describes how a language or environment will select which implementation of a method or function to use.

Examples are templates in C++, and generic programming in Fortran and other languages, in conjunction with function overloading (including operator overloading). Code is said to be monomorphised, with specific data types deduced and traced through the call graph, in order to instantiate specific versions of generic functions, and select specific function calls based on the supplied definitions.

This contrasts with dynamic dispatch, which is based on runtime information (such as vtable pointers and other forms of run time type information).

Static dispatch is possible because there is a guarantee of there only ever being a single implementation of the method in question. Static dispatch is typically faster than dynamic dispatch which by nature has higher overhead.

== Examples ==
Consider the following Rust program:

trait Pet {
    fn speak(&self);
}

struct Cat {
    name: String
}

impl Cat {
    fn new(name: String) -> Self {
        Cat { name }
    }
}

impl Pet for Cat {
    fn speak(&self) {
        println!("{} says Meow!", self.name);
    }
}

fn talk<T: Pet>(pet: T) {
    pet.speak();
}

fn main() {
    let pet = Cat::new(String::from("Simba"));
    talk(pet);
}

the Rust Compiler will monomorphize the program's code at compile time into:

// [...]
// struct Cat, Cat's impl, the Pet impl for struct Cat, and the Pet trait remain the same.
fn talk_cat(pet: Cat) {
    Cat::speak(&pet)
}

fn main() {
    let pet = Cat::new(String::from("Simba"));
    talk_cat(pet); // talk(pet) gets replaced with the more specialized talk_cat
}

(Note: Keep in mind that further optimizations might remove "talk_cat", opting to inline it into a direct call to the struct's impl like so: fn main() {     let pet = Cat::new(String::from("Simba"));     Cat::speak(&pet); } In which case "talk_cat" and "talk" will be omitted from the final optimized output due to dead code elimination.)

== See also ==
- Dynamic dispatch
