= Type erasure =

Process by which explicit type annotations are removed from a program

In programming languages, type erasure is the process of translating a program from a representation containing type information to one in which some or all of that information is omitted. Operational semantics not requiring programs to be accompanied by types are named type-erasure semantics, in contrast with type-passing semantics. Type-erasure semantics is an abstraction principle, ensuring that the run-time execution of a program doesn't depend on type information. In the context of generic programming, the opposite of type erasure is named reification.

== Type inference ==
The reverse operation is named type inference. Though type erasure can be an easy way to define typing over implicitly typed languages (an implicitly typed term is well-typed if and only if it is the erasure of a well-typed explicitly typed lambda term), it doesn't provide rules of inference for this definition.

== See also ==
- Template (C++)
- Problems with type erasure (in Generics in Java)
- Monomorphization
- Type polymorphism
