= C++29 =

Revision of the C++ programming language planned for 2029

C++29 is the informal name for the open standard revision of the International Organization for Standardization (ISO) and International Electrotechnical Commission (IEC) 14882 standard for the C++ programming language that follows C++26, planned for release in 2029.

The first meeting took place in June 2026 in Brno, Czech Republic.

No compiler fully supports C++29, and it is not yet finalized, but GCC has the most supported features of it so far.

== Features ==
=== Language ===
- An offset parameter for the #embed directive
- Support for contracts on virtual functions
- Pack indexing for variadic templates
- Designated initializers for constructing a base struct

import std;

using std::vector;

struct Base {
    int x;
};

struct Derived : public Base {
    int y;
};

vector<Derived> v = {
    Derived {.x = 1, .y = 2},
    Derived {{.x = 1}, .y = 2},
    Derived {.x{1}, .y{2}},
};

- Deallocation functions with a throwing specification (i.e. void operator delete(void* p) noexcept(false); are ill-formed)
- Conditional noexcept specifiers in concept compound requirements
- Support for = default; assignments for postfix increment/decrement operators (i.e. T operator++(T&, int) = default;
- Additional restrictions on defaulted assignment operator functions
- consteval-only values:
  - A value is consteval-only if it is either a reflection value or a pointer or pointer-to-member that points to either an immediate object or an immediate function.
  - An object is immediate if its complete object has either a constituent value that is consteval-only, or a constituent reference that refers to either an immediate object or an immediate function.
  - A variable is immediate if the object it declares is an immediate object.
- Additional named universal character escapes
- Coroutine promise return functions (return_void(), return_value()) are no longer mutually exclusive; this allows coroutines to return in different execution paths co_return; and co_return x;.
- Adopt the recommendations of Section 3.1 of Unicode Technical Standard #55, Unicode Source Handling, allowing identifiers to be composed from additional Unicode characters
- Specify captures of a lambda to be declared in the order of appearance
- Allow language linkage for templates; these may not necessarily work due to implementation-specific language linking rules, but the standard now allows it.

extern "C" {
    template <typename T>
    void f(T t);
    
    template <typename T>
    void g(void (*f)(T));
}

// extern "Java" is implementation-dependent
// could, for example, be used to implement Java generics
extern "Java" {
    template <typename T, typename U>
    void foo(T x, U y);
}

- Clarification of floating-point overflow
- Nondeterministic pointer provenance
- Atomic operations and operations on volatile pointers are defined to yield and store prospective pointer values
- Defined load and store operations for invalid pointers
- Labelled break and continue statements (following their adoption in C29 with the same syntax as Java). See multi-level breaks.

outer:
for (int i = 0; i < items.size(); ++i) {
	for (int j = 0; col < items[i].size(); ++j) {
		int current = items[i][j];
		if (current == -1) {
			std::println("Corrupted data at row {}, skipping rest of batch", i);
			continue outer; // Jumps straight to the next row
		}
		if (current == 99) {
			std::println("Target 99 found at [{}][{}]! Stopping search.", i, j);
			break outer; // Completely exits both loops
		}
		std::println("Checked item: {}", current);
	}
}

=== Library ===
- Adding a lookup() method to map types std::map<K, V>, std::unordered_map<K, V> and std::flat_map<K, V> which returns a std::optional<V&>
- A tagged pointer class std::pointer_tag_pair<Ptr, Tag, N> with constexpr support, in <memory>
- name_hint<T> and stack_size_hint for std::thread and std::jthread, which allows setting a thread stack size and a thread name
- void make_hazard_pointer_batch(span<hazard_pointer> batch); and void clear_hazard_pointer_batch(span<hazard_pointer> batch); for handling creation/destruction of hazard pointer batches
- Bit permutation functions, SIMD bit permutation, and bit shifting
- copy() and fill() algorithms for std::mdspan
- A std::simd::iota type
- has_error() method for std::expected<T, E>
- at() accessor for std::ranges::view_interface<D>
- std::formatter<> specialization for std::error_code
- Change default floating-point representation in std::format() to be in standard form
- intptr_t and uintptr_t are now required to be implemented
- Signed character types are deprecated from use in iostreams
- Revert string support in std::constant_wrapper<T>
- A type-erased view, std::ranges::any_view<T>, allowing customised traversal category and value type specification.
- A std::views::slice view adaptor for extracting a contiguous subrange from a sequence given a start and end index
- A get_ptr() method for std::optional to retrieve its stored pointer. Of particular interest for optional<T&>.

== Anticipated/discussed additions ==
Among some of the discussed features include Herb Sutter's "metaclasses" proposal (of which a similar feature already exists in his experimental alternative "Cpp2" syntax), which propose adoptable vocabulary for class boilerplate generation; to facilitate this, code injection for reflection would add token sequence injection into source code. This was later expanded with direct token sequence injection and token sequence macros, similar to syntactic macros, which already exist in languages like Rust.

Of particular interest were adding a more robust way of addressing undefined behavior. A proposal which enumerated all cases of undefined behavior specified in the C++ standard further proposed implicit contract assertions against undefined behavior, as well as unconstrained behavior (which takes the old definition of undefined behavior), as well as "profiles", which allow opt-in disabling unsafe behavior.

Pattern matching, a long-desired and anticipated feature for C++, has an ongoing proposal for C++29; rather than reusing switch, it uses a new match keyword, and also introduces match expressions (similar to Java and C#'s switch expressions). The proposal additionally depends on another feature, do expressions (a sequence of statements that is itself an expression), and is itself similar to a lambda with [&] capture that is immediately invoked. It uses a new keyword, do_return, to return the expression's value.

== See also ==
- C29 (C standard revision)
