= Lists of programming languages =

There are thousands of programming languages. These are listed in various ways:

- List of programming languages
- List of programming languages by type
- List of programming languages for artificial intelligence
- List of audio programming languages
- List of BASIC dialects
- List of C-family programming languages
- List of CLI languages
- List of concurrent and parallel programming languages
- List of educational programming languages
- Generational list of programming languages
- List of JVM languages
- List of Lisp-family programming languages
- List of open-source programming languages
- Non-English-based programming languages
- List of object-oriented programming languages
- List of reflective programming languages and platforms
- Timeline of programming languages
- Unisys MCP programming languages
