= CTFE (disambiguation) =

CTFE is the abbreviation of Chlorotrifluoroethylene

It may also refer to:

- Compile-time function execution
- Chow Tai Fook Enterprises, a Hong Kong-based conglomerate
