= Multi-use simulation models =

The concept of multi-use simulation models relates to the notion of pre-designed templates that are developed for use in simulation projects that simulate repetitive activities. These models can be perceived as “Building Blocks” which are designed for a specific purpose. The chief objective of this concept is to facilitate the conceptualisation and understanding of the simulation model by non-specialists. In practice, the concept can be implemented in different contexts, mainly in the construction industry; as those who work in the development of a simulation project are interested in the efficiency and effectiveness of their simulation model rather than its underpinning mathematical complexity.

The development of multi-use simulation models has been addressed by several studies during the last two decades. The first significant trial to make a general-purpose simulation was presented by Hajjar and AbouRizk, 1997. They developed a general purpose simulation model to be used in the estimation and planning of earth moving operations based on reusable templates. Other research was to use reusable templates in preparing draft scheduling for the construction of similar projects. The templates were made to encode much of the knowledge dealing with activity scoping and sequencing and the use of special activity in planning structures. Similarly, an interactive simulation system to be adapted by a beginner level user was developed in 1999. This system was designed to provide easy access and a manipulative environment for studying, analyzing and simulating construction processes. He used a simple and attractive graphical user interface to overcome the potential resistance of the user to simulation as an analytical tool.
