= List of reflective programming languages and platforms =

Programming languages and computing platforms that typically support reflective programming (reflection) include dynamically typed languages such as Smalltalk, Perl, PHP, Python, VBScript, and JavaScript. Also the .NET languages are supported and the Maude system of rewriting logic. Very rarely there are some non-dynamic or unmanaged languages, notable examples being Delphi, eC, and Objective-C.

Most languages supporting reflection use runtime reflection (such as Java, Python, etc.), but some use compile time reflection (such as C++).

- APL
- Befunge
- BlitzMax
- C++
- ColdFusion MX
- Curl
- D
- Delphi
- eC
- ECMAScript
  - ActionScript
  - JavaScript
  - JScript
- Eiffel
- Factor
- Forth
- Go
- Io
- Java (see java.lang.reflect)
  - Java virtual machine
- Julia
- Lisp
  - Logo
  - Pico
- Logtalk
- Lua
- Maude system
- .NET Common Language Runtime
  - C#
  - F#
  - Visual Basic (.NET)
  - Delphi (.NET)
  - Windows PowerShell
- Oberon
- Object Pascal
- Perl
- PHP
- PL/SQL
- POP-11, Poplog
- Prolog
- Python
- R
- Rebol
- Ruby
- Rust (using third-party libraries)
- Scheme
- Smalltalk
  - Pharo
  - Bistro
  - Squeak
  - Self
- SuperCollider
- SNOBOL
- Tcl
  - XOTcl
- Visual FoxPro
- Wolfram Mathematica
  - Wolfram Language
- Xojo
