= Herb Sutter =

US computer programmer and author

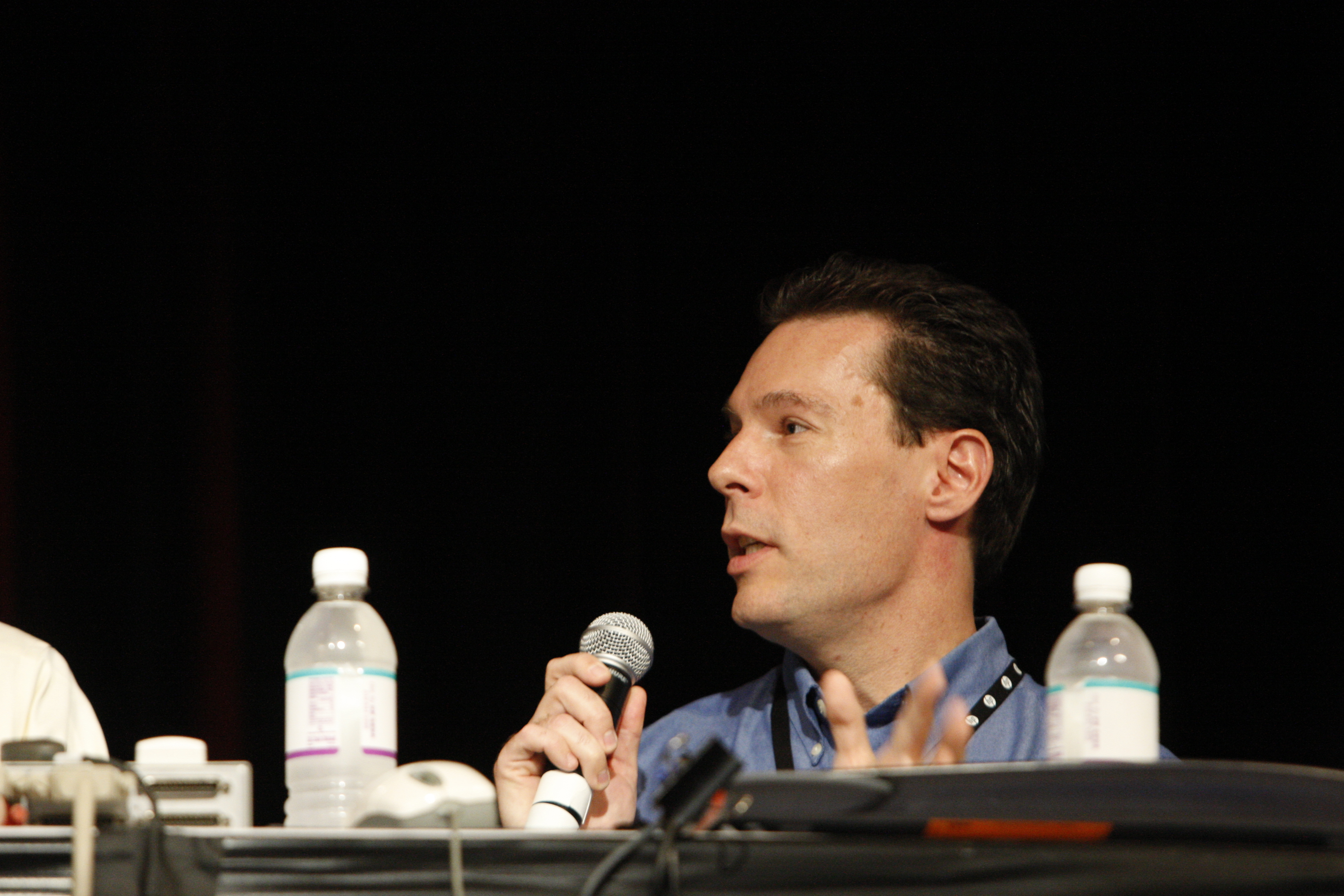
Sutter in 2009

Herb Sutter is a prominent C++ expert. He is also an author of several books on C++ and was a columnist for Dr. Dobb's Journal.

== Education and career ==
Sutter was born and raised in Oakville, Ontario, and studied computer science at Canada's University of Waterloo.

From 1995 to 2001 he was chief technology officer at PeerDirect where he designed the PeerDirect database replication engine.

He joined Microsoft in 2002 as a platform evangelist for Visual C++ .NET, rising to lead software architect for C++/CLI. In recent years Sutter was lead designer for C++/CX and C++ AMP. In November 2024, after 22 years at Microsoft, Sutter left to join Citadel Securities.

Sutter has served as the chair of the ISO C++ standards committee since 2002.

In 2005, Sutter published an article titled "The Free Lunch Is Over" that claimed that microprocessor serial-processing speed was reaching a physical limit leading to two main consequences:

- Processor manufacturers would focus on products that better support multithreading (such as multi-core processors), and
- Software developers would be forced to develop massively multithreaded programs as a way to better use such processors.

The article is seen as highly influential in subsequent system design.

== Cpp2 ==
Cpp2
- Logo endorsed by the C++ standards committee
- Paradigms: Multi-paradigm: procedural, imperative, functional, object-oriented, generic, modular, reflective, Design by contract
- Designed by: Herb Sutter
- Developer: Herb Sutter
- First appeared: 2022
- Typing discipline: Static, strong, nominative, partially inferred
- OS: Cross-platform
- Filename extensions: .cpp2
- Website: hsutter.github.io/cppfront

Major implementations
- cppfront

Influenced by
- C++, C#, Rust, Swift, Go, TypeScript

Cpp2 is an experimental alternative syntax for C++ created by Herb Sutter, first developed in 2021 and announced in September 2022. Rather than a separate language, it is an alternative syntax that is transpiled down to standard C++ using the cppfront compiler (whose name is a reference to the Cfront compiler, which was created by Bjarne Stroustrup to transpile C++ down to C), uses the usual C++ Standard Library, and allows compatibility and coexistence with standard C++ syntax. Unlike standard C++ itself, Cpp2 code is order-independent (a function may be called earlier in a file even if its declaration appears later in the file). In addition, it advertises increased program safety (such as memory safety) over standard C++.

The following is a Hello World program in Cpp2:

main: () -> int = {
    std::println("Hello, world!");
}

A basic example with a type, is the following. In Cpp2, data members are private by default, while methods are public by default, but can otherwise be specified with private/protected/public.

using std::string;

Person: type = {
    name: string;

    getName: (this) = { return name; }
}

main: (args) -> int = {
    john: Person = ("John Doe");
    std::println("Hello, (john.getName())$!");
}

Cpp2 has its own reflection and contract systems that predate the native C++ reflection and contract systems (added in C++26), with support for metaclasses (a feature Sutter has also proposed for inclusion into standard C++).

== Bibliography ==
- Exceptional C++ (Addison-Wesley, 2000, ISBN 0-201-61562-2)
- More Exceptional C++ (Addison-Wesley, 2002, ISBN 0-201-70434-X)
- Exceptional C++ Style (Addison-Wesley, 2005, ISBN 0-201-76042-8)
- C++ Coding Standards (together with Andrei Alexandrescu, Addison-Wesley, 2005, ISBN 0-321-11358-6)
