= Mirror (programming) =

Type of reflection mechanism in programming

In computer programming, a mirror is a reflection mechanism that is completely decoupled from the object whose structure is being introspected. This is as opposed to traditional reflection, for example in Java, where one introspects an object using methods from the object itself (e.g. java.lang.Object's getClass() method to get a java.lang.Class<?>).

Mirrors adhere to the qualities of encapsulation, stratification and ontological correspondence.

== Benefits ==
Decoupling the reflection mechanism from the objects themselves allows for a few benefits:

- The object's interface is not polluted, so there is no danger of breaking reflection by overriding a reflective method.
- There can be different mirror systems.
- The mirror system can be removed entirely (potentially allowing for optimizations).
- A mirror system can operate on remote code, since it is not coupled with a particular machine.

== Languages that use mirrors ==
- C++, via the ^^ operator and the returned fundamental type std::meta::info.
- C#, via the typeof operator (see typeof) and its returned System.Type instance, representing a type metadata.
- Dart, via the reflect() function.
- Inko, via its std::mirror module.
- Java, via X.class which returns a java.lang.Class instance representing a type metadata; note that unlike java.lang.Object's getClass() method, which returns a wildcarded java.lang.Class<?>, X.class is a java.lang.Class<X>.
- Kotlin, via X::class which returns a kotlin.reflect.KClass<X>. Note that in Kotlin, a Java class metadata (java.lang.Class<X>) can be obtained with X::class.java.
- Rubinius (Ruby implementation), via the Rubinius::Mirror.reflect() method.
- Rust, via std::mem::type_info::Type and std::any::TypeId.
- Scala
- Swift, via the Swift.Mirror class and the reflect() function.

== See also ==
- Reflective programming
- Metaclass
- Metaprogramming
