= C++ syntax =

Set of rules defining correctly structured C++ program

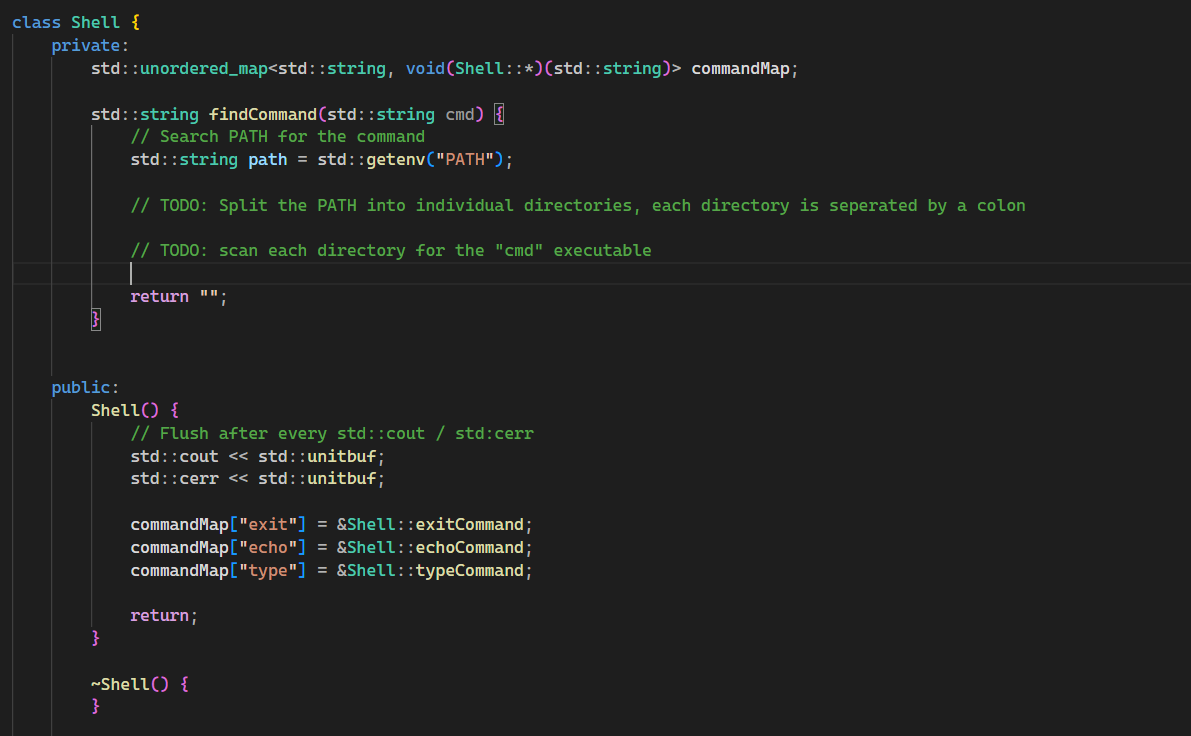
A snippet of C++ code

The syntax of C++ is the set of rules defining how a C++ program is written and compiled.

C++ syntax is largely inherited from the syntax of its ancestor language C, and has influenced the syntax of several later languages including but not limited to Java, C#, and Rust.

== Basics ==
Much of C++'s syntax aligns with C syntax, as C++ provides backwards compatibility with C.

The C++ "Hello, World!" program program is as follows:

import std;

int main(int argc, char* argv[]) {
    std::println("Hello, world!");
}

Prior to C++23, the "Hello, world!" program used iostreams.

#include <iostream>

int main(int argc, char* argv[]) {
    std::cout << "Hello, world!" << std::endl;
}

=== Identifier ===
An identifier is the name of an element in the code. There are certain standard naming conventions to follow when selecting names for elements. Identifiers in C++ are case-sensitive.

An identifier can contain:

- Any Unicode character that is a letter (including numeric letters like Roman numerals) or digit.
- Currency sign (such as ¥).
- Connecting punctuation character (such as _).

An identifier cannot:

- Start with a digit.
- Be equal to a reserved keyword, null literal or Boolean literal.

The identifier nullptr is not a reserved word, but is a global constant that refers to a null pointer literal. Similarly, the words true and false refer to the Boolean values true and false respectively.

Since C++26, the identifier of just an underscore (_) acts as an unnamed placeholder; it can be reused in multiple declarations in the same scope (like auto [_, username, _] = getUserData();), and suppresses compiler warnings of no use (equivalent to the [[maybe_unused]] attribute); trying to read and write to _ later is ill-formed.

=== Keywords ===
==== Keywords ====
The following words may not be used as identifier names or redefined, of which there are 80.

- alignas
- alignof
- asm
- auto
- bool
- break
- case
- catch
- char
- char8_t
- char16_t
- char32_t
- class
- concept
- const
- consteval
- constexpr
- constinit
- const_cast
- continue
- contract_assert
- co_await
- co_return
- co_yield
- decltype
- default
- do
- double
- dynamic_cast
- else
- enum
- explicit
- export
- extern
- float
- for
- friend
- goto
- if
- inline
- int
- long
- mutable
- namespace
- new
- noexcept
- operator
- private
- protected
- public
- register
- reinterpret_cast
- requires
- return
- short
- signed
- sizeof
- static
- static_assert
- static_cast
- struct
- switch
- template
- this
- thread_local
- throw
- try
- typedef
- typeid
- typename
- union
- unsigned
- using
- virtual
- void
- volatile
- wchar_t
- while

The keyword restrict, introduced in C99, is a type qualifier used to provide information about pointer aliasing to the compiler. It is not part of the C++ standard, although some C++ compilers provide it as a language extension.

The keyword fortran is a conditionally supported keyword in C. It is a type specifier used to indicate Fortran language linkage for function declarations and other external declarations, allowing implementations to provide calling conventions and name mangling suitable for interoperability with Fortran code. C++ does not define fortran as a standard keyword (unlike asm); however, C++ implementations may conditionally support language linkage specifications for languages other than C and C++, including Fortran.

==== Reserved words for literal values ====
The following words refer to literal values used by the language, of which there are 3.

- true
- false
- nullptr

==== Alternative operator keywords ====
The following words are reserved keywords, but are used as alternative spellings for operators and tokens that use non-ISO646 characters, of which there are 11.

- and
- and_eq
- bitand
- bitor
- compl
- not
- not_eq
- or
- or_eq
- xor
- xor_eq

==== Identifiers with special meaning ====
The following words may be used as identifier names, but bear special meanings in certain contexts, of which there are 7.

- _
- final
- import
- module
- override
- pre
- post

==== Preprocessor directives ====
The following tokens are recognised by the preprocessor in the context of preprocessor directives, of which there are 20.

- #if
- #elif
- #else
- #endif
- #ifdef
- #ifndef
- #elifdef
- #elifndef
- #define
- #undef
- #include
- #embed
- #line
- #error
- #warning
- #pragma
- #__has_include
- #__has_cpp_attribute
- #__has_embed
- defined (follows a conditional directive)

The following macros are defined in the C/C++ standard library:

- NULL (expands to (void*)0, used prior to the introduction of nullptr to represent a null pointer)
- NDEBUG (a macro meaning "no-debug", used primarily to disable assert() if defined)
- assert() (a macro with arguments, which terminates the program if the argument evaluates to false, 0, or nullptr, and can be disabled by NDEBUG)
- __COUNTER__ (a macro time such that when used, the preprocessor expands it into a unique sequential integer literal, starting from 0 and increments by 1 every time it is expanded) (Note: __COUNTER__ macro is not a standard C++ feature.)

==== Technical specification keywords ====
The following keywords are keywords in some C++ technical specifications, but not the main language itself.

The former reflection technical specification proposed the keyword reflexpr, however C++26's finalised reflection instead used a new operator ^^ instead of reflexpr.

The transactional memory technical specification introduces these keywords, of which there are 4.

- atomic_cancel
- atomic_commit
- atomic_noexcept
- synchronized

The following identifiers with special meaning are introduced, of which there are 2.

- transaction_safe
- transaction_safe_dynamic

==== Reserved namespaces ====
The C++ standard reserves the namespaces std (for C++ standard library symbols) and posix (unused, but reserved for ISO/IEC 9945 and POSIX-related symbols). It is undefined behaviour to add declarations or definitions to these namespaces, with the exception of adding template specialisations to symbols in namespace std. The C++ standard further reserves the module names matching std and std.*.

=== Code blocks ===
The separators { and } signify a code block and a new scope. Class members and the body of a method are examples of what can live inside these braces in various contexts.

Inside of method bodies, braces may be used to create new scopes, as follows:

void doSomething() {
    int a;

    {
        int b;
        a = 1;
    }

    a = 2;
    b = 3; // Illegal because the variable b is declared in an inner scope.
}

=== Comments ===
C++ has two kinds of comments: traditional comments and end-of-line comments.

Traditional comments, also known as block comments, start with /* and end with */, they may span across multiple lines.

/* This is a multi-line comment.
It may occupy more than one line. */

End-of-line comments start with // and extend to the end of the current line.

// This is an end-of-line comment

Documentation comments in the source files are processed by the external Doxygen tool to generate documentation. This type of comment is identical to traditional comments, except it starts with /** and follows conventions defined by the Doxygen tool. Technically, these comments are a special kind of traditional comment and they are not specifically defined in the language specification.

/**
 * This is a documentation comment.
 * 
 * @author John Doe
 */

=== Command-line arguments ===
Much like in C, the parameters given on a command line are passed to a C++ program with two predefined variables - the count of the command-line arguments in argc and the individual arguments as character strings in the pointer array argv. So the command:

myFilt p1 p2 p3

results in something like:

m	y	F	i	l	t	\0	p	1	\0	p	2	\0	p	3	\0
argv[0]							argv[1]			argv[2]			argv[3]		

While individual strings are arrays of contiguous characters, there is no guarantee that the strings are stored as a contiguous group.

The name of the program, argv[0], may be useful when printing diagnostic messages or for making one binary serve multiple purposes. The individual values of the parameters may be accessed with argv[1], argv[2], and argv[3], as shown in the following program:

import std;

int main(int argc, char* argv[]) {
    std::println("argc = {}", argc);
    for (size_t i = 0; i < argc; ++i) {
        std::println("argv[{}] = {}", i, argv[i]);
    }
}

== Objects ==
C++ introduces object-oriented programming (OOP) features to C. It offers classes, which provide the four features commonly present in OOP (and some non-OOP) languages: abstraction, encapsulation, inheritance, and polymorphism. One distinguishing feature of C++ classes compared to classes in other programming languages is support for deterministic destructors, which in turn provide support for the Resource Acquisition is Initialization (RAII) concept.

== Object storage ==
As in C, C++ supports four types of memory management: static storage duration objects, thread storage duration objects, automatic storage duration objects, and dynamic storage duration objects.

=== Static storage duration objects ===
Static storage duration objects are created before main() is entered (see exceptions below) and destroyed in reverse order of creation after main() exits. The exact order of creation is not specified by the standard (though there are some rules defined below) to allow implementations some freedom in how to organize their implementation. More formally, objects of this type have a lifespan that "shall last for the duration of the program".

Static storage duration objects are initialized in two phases. First, "static initialization" is performed, and only after all static initialization is performed, "dynamic initialization" is performed. In static initialization, all objects are first initialized with zeros; after that, all objects that have a constant initialization phase are initialized with the constant expression (i.e. variables initialized with a literal or constexpr). Though it is not specified in the standard, the static initialization phase can be completed at compile time and saved in the data partition of the executable. Dynamic initialization involves all object initialization done via a constructor or function call (unless the function is marked with constexpr, in C++11). The dynamic initialization order is defined as the order of declaration within the compilation unit (i.e. the same file). No guarantees are provided about the order of initialization between compilation units.

=== Thread storage duration objects ===
Variables of this type are very similar to static storage duration objects. The main difference is the creation time is just before thread creation, and destruction is done after the thread has been joined.

=== Automatic storage duration objects ===
The most common variable types in C++ are local variables inside a function or block, and temporary variables. The common feature about automatic variables is that they have a lifetime that is limited to the scope of the variable. They are created and potentially initialized at the point of declaration (see below for details) and destroyed in the reverse order of creation when the scope is left. This is implemented by allocation on the stack.

Local variables are created as the point of execution passes the declaration point. If the variable has a constructor or initializer this is used to define the initial state of the object. Local variables are destroyed when the local block or function that they are declared in is closed. C++ destructors for local variables are called at the end of the object lifetime, allowing a discipline for automatic resource management termed RAII, which is widely used in C++.

Member variables are created when the parent object is created. Array members are initialized from 0 to the last member of the array in order. Member variables are destroyed when the parent object is destroyed in the reverse order of creation. i.e. If the parent is an "automatic object" then it will be destroyed when it goes out of scope which triggers the destruction of all its members.

Temporary variables are created as the result of expression evaluation and are destroyed when the statement containing the expression has been fully evaluated (usually at the ; at the end of a statement).

=== Dynamic storage duration objects ===
These objects have a dynamic lifespan and can be created directly with a call to new and destroyed explicitly with a call to delete. C++ also supports malloc and free, from C, but these are not compatible with new and delete. Use of new returns an address to the allocated memory. The C++ Core Guidelines advise against using new directly for creating dynamic objects in favor of smart pointers through make_unique<T> for single ownership and make_shared<T> for reference-counted multiple ownership, which were introduced in C++11.

== Interoperability ==
=== With C ===
C++ is often considered to be a superset of C but this is not strictly true. Most C code can easily be made to compile correctly in C++ but there are a few differences that cause some valid C code to be invalid or behave differently in C++. For example, C allows implicit conversion from void* to other pointer types but C++ does not (for type safety reasons). Also, C++ defines many new keywords, such as new and class, which may be used as identifiers (for example, variable names) in a C program.

Some incompatibilities have been removed by the 1999 revision of the C standard (C99), which now supports C++ features such as line comments (//) and declarations mixed with code. On the other hand, C99 introduced a number of new features that C++ did not support that were incompatible or redundant in C++, such as variable-length arrays, native complex-number types (however, the std::complex<T> class in the C++ standard library provides similar functionality, although not code-compatible), designated initializers, compound literals, and the restrict keyword. Some of the C99-introduced features were included in the subsequent version of the C++ standard, C++11 (out of those which were not redundant). However, the C++11 standard introduces new incompatibilities, such as disallowing assignment of a string literal to a character pointer, which remains valid C.

To intermix C and C++ code, any function declaration or definition that is to be called from/used both in C and C++ must be declared with C linkage by placing it within an extern "C" { /* ... */ } block. Such a function may not rely on features depending on name mangling (i.e., function overloading).

=== Inline assembly ===
Programs developed in C or C++ often utilize inline assembly to take advantage of its low-level functionalities, greater speed, and enhanced control compared to high-level programming languages when optimizing for performance is essential. C++ provides support for embedding assembly language using asm declarations, but the compatibility of inline assembly varies significantly between compilers and architectures. Unlike high-level language features such as Python or Java, assembly code is highly dependent on the underlying processor and compiler implementation.

==== Variations across compilers ====
Different C++ compilers implement inline assembly in distinct ways.

- GCC (GNU Compiler Collection) and Clang: Use the GCC extended inline assembly syntax. Using __asm__ keyword instead of asm when writing code that can be compiled with -ansi and -std options, which allows specifying input/output operands and clobbered registers. This approach is widely adopted, including by Intel and IBM compilers.
- MSVC (Microsoft Visual C++): The inline assembler is built into the compiler. Previously supported inline assembly via the __asm keyword, but this support has been removed in 64-bit mode, requiring separate .asm modules instead.
- TI ARM Clang and Embedded Compilers: Some embedded system compilers, like Texas Instruments' TI Arm Clang, allow inline assembly but impose stricter rules to avoid conflicts with register conventions and calling conventions.

==== Interoperability between C++ and Assembly ====
C++ provides two primary methods of integrating ASM code.

1. Standalone assembly files – Assembly code is written separately and linked with C++ code.
2. Inline assembly – Assembly code is embedded within C++ code using compiler-specific extensions.

For example, when calling an assembly function from C++, use extern "C" to prevent C++ name mangling.

// main.cpp
import std;

extern "C" int addFromAsm(int, int); // Declare the assembly function

int main() {
    int result = addFromAsm(5, 7);
    std::println("Result from assembly: {}", result);
    return 0;
}

# asm code using RISC-V architecture
.section .text
.global addFromAsm

addFromAsm:
    add a0, a0, a1  # Add first argument (a0) and second argument (a1), store in a0
    ret             # Return (a0 holds return value)

Global variables in assembly must be declared as extern in C++ and marked .global in assembly.

// main.cpp
import std;

extern "C" int globalVar; // Declare global variable from assembly

int main() {
    std::println("Global variable from assembly: {}", globalVar);
    return 0;
}

# asm using RISC-V architecture
.section .data
.global globalVar
.align 4
globalVar:
    .word 42   # Define integer value

Inline assembly allows embedding ASM directly in C++ using the asm keyword.

// main.cpp (compiled on GCC/Clang)
import std;

int main() {
    int x = 10;
    int y = 20;
    int sum;

    asm volatile (
        "add %0, %1, %2"
        : "=r" (sum) // Output operand (stored in a register)
        : "r" (x), "r" (y) // Input operands (stored in registers)
    );

    std::println("Sum using inline assembly: {}", sum);
    return 0;
}

== Encapsulation ==
Encapsulation is the hiding of information to ensure that data structures and operators are used as intended and to make the usage model more obvious to the developer. C++ provides the ability to define classes and functions as its primary encapsulation mechanisms. Within a class, members can be declared as either public, protected, or private to explicitly enforce encapsulation. A public member of the class is accessible to any function. A private member is accessible only to functions that are members of that class and to functions and classes explicitly granted access permission by the class ("friends"). A protected member is accessible to members of classes that inherit from the class in addition to the class itself and any friends.

The object-oriented principle ensures the encapsulation of all and only the functions that access the internal representation of a type. C++ supports this principle via member functions and friend functions, but it does not enforce it. Programmers can declare parts or all of the representation of a type to be public, and they are allowed to make public entities not part of the representation of a type. Therefore, C++ supports not just object-oriented programming, but other decomposition paradigms such as modular programming.

It is generally considered good practice to make all data private or protected, and to make public only those functions that are part of a minimal interface for users of the class. This can hide the details of data implementation, allowing the designer to later fundamentally change the implementation without changing the interface in any way.

=== Inheritance ===
Inheritance allows one data type to acquire properties of other data types. Inheritance from a base class may be declared as public, protected, or private. This access specifier determines whether unrelated and derived classes can access the inherited public and protected members of the base class. Only public inheritance corresponds to what is usually meant by "inheritance". The other two forms are much less frequently used. If the access specifier is omitted, a "class" inherits privately, while a "struct" inherits publicly. Base classes may be declared as virtual; this is called virtual inheritance. Virtual inheritance ensures that only one instance of a base class exists in the inheritance graph, avoiding some of the ambiguity problems of multiple inheritance.

Multiple inheritance is a C++ feature allowing a class to be derived from more than one base class; this allows for more elaborate inheritance relationships. For example, a "Flying Cat" class can inherit from both "Cat" and "Flying Mammal". Some other languages, such as C# or Java, accomplish something similar (although more limited) by allowing inheritance of multiple interfaces while restricting the number of base classes to one (interfaces, unlike classes, provide only declarations of member functions, no implementation or member data). An interface as in C# and Java can be defined in C++ as a class containing only pure virtual functions, often known as an abstract base class or "ABC". The member functions of such an abstract base class are normally explicitly defined in the derived class, not inherited implicitly. C++ virtual inheritance exhibits an ambiguity resolution feature called dominance.

== Operators and operator overloading ==
Operators that cannot be overloaded
Operator	Symbol
Scope resolution	::
Conditional	?:
dot	.
Member selection	.*
"sizeof"	sizeof
"typeid"	typeid

C++ provides more than 35 operators, covering basic arithmetic, bit manipulation, indirection, comparisons, logical operations and others. Almost all operators can be overloaded for user-defined types, with a few notable exceptions such as member access (. and .*) and the conditional operator. The rich set of overloadable operators is central to making user-defined types in C++ seem like built-in types.

Overloadable operators are also an essential part of many advanced C++ programming techniques, such as smart pointers. Overloading an operator does not change the precedence of calculations involving the operator, nor does it change the number of operands that the operator uses (any operand may however be ignored by the operator, though it will be evaluated prior to execution). Overloaded "&&" and "||" operators lose their short-circuit evaluation property.

== Polymorphism ==
Polymorphism enables one common interface for many implementations, and for objects to act differently under different circumstances.

C++ supports several kinds of static (resolved at compile-time) and dynamic (resolved at run-time) polymorphisms, supported by the language features described above. Compile-time polymorphism does not allow for certain run-time decisions, while runtime polymorphism typically incurs a performance penalty.

=== Dynamic polymorphism ===
==== Inheritance ====
Variable pointers and references to a base class type in C++ can also refer to objects of any derived classes of that type. This allows arrays and other kinds of containers to hold pointers to objects of differing types (references cannot be directly held in containers). This enables dynamic (run-time) polymorphism, where the referred objects can behave differently, depending on their (actual, derived) types.

C++ also provides the dynamic_cast operator, which allows code to safely attempt conversion of an object, via a base reference/pointer, to a more derived type: downcasting. The attempt is necessary as often one does not know which derived type is referenced. (Upcasting, conversion to a more general type, can always be checked/performed at compile-time via static_cast, as ancestral classes are specified in the derived class's interface, visible to all callers.) dynamic_cast relies on run-time type information (RTTI), metadata in the program that enables differentiating types and their relationships. If a dynamic_cast to a pointer fails, the result is the nullptr constant, whereas if the destination is a reference (which cannot be null), the cast throws an exception. Objects known to be of a certain derived type can be cast to that with static_cast, bypassing RTTI and the safe runtime type-checking of dynamic_cast, so this should be used only if the programmer is very confident the cast is, and will always be, valid.

==== Virtual member functions ====
Ordinarily, when a function in a derived class overrides a function in a base class, the function to call is determined by the type of the object. A given function is overridden when there exists no difference in the number or type of parameters between two or more definitions of that function. Hence, at compile time, it may not be possible to determine the type of the object and therefore the correct function to call, given only a base class pointer; the decision is therefore put off until runtime. This is called dynamic dispatch. Virtual member functions or methods allow the most specific implementation of the function to be called, according to the actual run-time type of the object. In C++ implementations, this is commonly done using virtual function tables. If the object type is known, this may be bypassed by prepending a fully qualified class name before the function call, but in general calls to virtual functions are resolved at run time.

In addition to standard member functions, operator overloads and destructors can be virtual. An inexact rule based on practical experience states that if any function in the class is virtual, the destructor should be as well. As the type of an object at its creation is known at compile time, constructors, and by extension copy constructors, cannot be virtual. Nonetheless, a situation may arise where a copy of an object needs to be created when a pointer to a derived object is passed as a pointer to a base object. In such a case, a common solution is to create a clone() (or similar) virtual function that creates and returns a copy of the derived class when called.

A member function can also be made "pure virtual" by appending it with = 0 after the closing parenthesis and before the semicolon. A class containing a pure virtual function is called an abstract class. Objects cannot be created from an abstract class; they can only be derived from. Any derived class inherits the virtual function as pure and must provide a non-pure definition of it (and all other pure virtual functions) before objects of the derived class can be created. A program that attempts to create an object of a class with a pure virtual member function or inherited pure virtual member function is ill-formed.

== Static polymorphism ==
Function overloading allows programs to declare multiple functions having the same name but with different arguments (i.e. ad hoc polymorphism). The functions are distinguished by the number or types of their formal parameters. Thus, the same function name can refer to different functions depending on the context in which it is used. The type returned by the function is not used to distinguish overloaded functions and differing return types would result in a compile-time error message.

When declaring a function, a programmer can specify for one or more parameters a default value. Doing so allows the parameters with defaults to optionally be omitted when the function is called, in which case the default arguments will be used. When a function is called with fewer arguments than there are declared parameters, explicit arguments are matched to parameters in left-to-right order, with any unmatched parameters at the end of the parameter list being assigned their default arguments. In many cases, specifying default arguments in a single function declaration is preferable to providing overloaded function definitions with different numbers of parameters.

=== Templates ===
C++ templates enable generic programming. C++ supports function, class, alias, and variable templates. Templates may be parameterized by types, compile-time constants, and other templates. Templates are implemented by instantiation at compile-time. To instantiate a template, compilers substitute specific arguments for a template's parameters to generate a concrete function or class instance. Some substitutions are not possible; these are eliminated by an overload resolution policy described by the phrase "Substitution failure is not an error" (SFINAE). Templates are a powerful tool that can be used for generic programming, template metaprogramming, and code optimization, but this power implies a cost. Template use may increase object code size, because each template instantiation produces a copy of the template code: one for each set of template arguments, however, this is the same or smaller amount of code that would be generated if the code were written by hand. This is in contrast to run-time generics seen in other languages (e.g., Java) where at compile-time the type is erased and a single template body is preserved.

using std::string;

template <typename T>
class Box {
private:
    T value;
public:
    explicit Box(T v):
        value{v} {}

    void show() {
        std::println("Value: {}", value);
    }
};

Box<int> box1(100);
Box<string> box2("Hello, world!");

box1.show();
box2.show();

Templates are different from macros: while both of these compile-time language features enable conditional compilation, templates are not restricted to lexical substitution. Templates are aware of the semantics and type system of their companion language, as well as all compile-time type definitions, and can perform high-level operations including programmatic flow control based on evaluation of strictly type-checked parameters. Macros are capable of conditional control over compilation based on predetermined criteria, but cannot instantiate new types, recurse, or perform type evaluation and in effect are limited to pre-compilation text-substitution and text-inclusion/exclusion. In other words, macros can control compilation flow based on pre-defined symbols but cannot, unlike templates, independently instantiate new symbols. Templates are a tool for static polymorphism (see below) and generic programming.

In addition, templates are a compile-time mechanism in C++ that is Turing-complete, meaning that any computation expressible by a computer program can be computed, in some form, by a template metaprogram before runtime.

In summary, a template is a compile-time parameterized function or class written without knowledge of the specific arguments used to instantiate it. After instantiation, the resulting code is equivalent to code written specifically for the passed arguments. In this manner, templates provide a way to decouple generic, broadly applicable aspects of functions and classes (encoded in templates) from specific aspects (encoded in template parameters) without sacrificing performance due to abstraction.

Templates in C++ provide a sophisticated mechanism for writing generic, polymorphic code (i.e. parametric polymorphism). In particular, through the curiously recurring template pattern, it is possible to implement a form of static polymorphism that closely mimics the syntax for overriding virtual functions. Because C++ templates are type-aware and Turing-complete, they can also be used to let the compiler resolve recursive conditionals and generate substantial programs through template metaprogramming. Contrary to some opinion, template code will not generate a bulk code after compilation with the proper compiler settings.

C++ additionally features variadic templates. These may be used to implement type-safe variadic functions, as otherwise C++ has only C's type-unsafe variadics.

using std::common_type_t;

template <typename... Ts>
common_type_t<Ts...> sum(Ts... args) {
    return (args + ...);
}

== Assertions and contracts ==
=== Assertions ===
In C++, there are two forms of non-contract assertions: runtime assertions, and compile time assertions.

Runtime assertions are performed using the assert() macro, which is provided by the <cassert> header (itself inherited from the C header <assert.h>). If the expression within the assert() macro is false, it will print an error message to the standard error stream and halt the program, providing the source filename and source line (obtained from __FILE__ and __LINE__).

using std::vector;

int getAtIndex(const vector<int>& v, size_t i) {
    assert(i >= 0); // Ensures i is at least 0
    assert(i < v.size()); // Ensures i is less than the length of v
    return v[i];
}

The presence of the flag NDEBUG disables assertions.

Compile-time assertions are performed using a static_assert statement (introduced in C++11). static_assert is a keyword, unlike assert which is a macro. Static assertions, which are enforced at compilation, are used when verifying conditions during compilation. This has historically made them useful in template metaprogramming, especially with SFINAE patterns (before the introduction of concepts in C++20.

using std::is_integral_v;

template <typename T>
void process() {
    static_assert(is_integral_v<T>, "T must be an integral type");
    // ...
}

process<int>(); // OK
process<double>(); // Compilation error

=== Contracts ===
Contracts (since C++26) are a first-class assertion system that allows for runtime enforcement of preconditions, postconditions and internal state.

int f(const int x)
    pre (x != 1) // a precondition assertion
    post (r : r == x && r != 2) // a postcondition assertion; r names the result object of f
{
    contract_assert(x != 3); // an assertion statement
    return x;
}

pre and post consist of expressions which should evaluate to true. post specifically allows optionally naming the returned result, on the left of the colon (for example, post (value : predicate(value))). A failure to evaluate is equivalent to the expression evaluating to false, both triggering a contract violation.

Here, C++ indicates the preconditions and postconditions with pre and post respectively, within the function's signature.

In particular, C++ introduces a contract_assert statement which is used to verify an internal condition; violation of a contract invokes the contract-violation handler, an object of type std::contracts::contract_violation is produced and passed to the contract-violation handler, a function in the global namespace of the following signature void handle_contract_violation(contract_violation cv); (which may optionally be noexcept). This may additionally be called manually using std::contracts::invoke_default_contract_violation_handler().

What is done by the runtime is determined by std::contracts::evaluation_semantic:

- evaluation_semantic::ignore: evaluation of a contract assertion is a no-op
- evaluation_semantic::observe: a diagnostic is produced and the violation handler is called, and the program continues after the point of evaluation of the contract assertion
- evaluation_semantic::enforce: the violation handler is called, and then the program is contract-terminated
- evaluation_semantic::quick_enforce: the program is contract-terminated, without calling the violation handler

Contracts can be specified to always be run by using the std::contracts::controls::enforced object. This object's type is not specified, but the object passed inside the angle brackets of pre/post/contract_assert must always denote or resolve to std::contracts::controls::enforced.

import std;

using std::contracts::controls::enforced;

int f(int x)
    pre<enforced>(x > 0)
    post<enforced>(r : r > 0)
{
    contract_assert<enforced>(x > 0);
    return x;
}

== Lambda expressions ==
C++ provides support for anonymous functions, also known as lambda expressions, with the general form [captures] [[front-annotations]] <template-parameters> [[annotations]] (params) specs requires (...) -> returns contract-specs { body } (where annotations includes both annotations and attributes).

Since C++20, the keyword template is optional for template parameters of lambda expressions.

If the lambda takes no parameters, the () for the parameters may be omitted; that is, [captures] -> returns { body }.

The return type of a lambda expression can be automatically inferred, if possible; e.g.:

using std::runtime_error;

// inferred
auto lambda1 = [](int x, int y) { return x + y; };
// explicit, with attribute
auto lambda2 = [](int x, int y) [[nodiscard]] -> int { return x + y; };
// without parameter list
auto lambda3 = [] -> int { return 1; };
// throwing from lambda, with noreturn attribute
auto lambda4 = [] [[noreturn]] -> void { throw runtime_error("Throwing from a lambda"); };

The [captures] list supports the definition of closures. Such lambda expressions are defined in the standard as syntactic sugar for an unnamed function object.

== Coroutines ==
C++20 introduces support for coroutines, which are stackless functions whose execution may be suspended, by returning to the caller while the data needed to resume execution is stored separate from the stack, allowing for asynchronous, non-blocking execution. In C++, coroutines are not coloured by a async keyword like they are in C#, but rather by the return type.

The following keywords are introduced:

- co_await: performs an await, suspeding execution until resumation and returns control to the caller
- co_yield: suspends execution of the current coroutine and returns a value to the caller.
- co_return: completes execution returning a value

Programmers must implement a number of public member functions, such as await_ready(), await_suspend(), and await_resume() on the return type in order for the type to be awaited on.

The promise object must bear the name promise_type as a nested type (for any type T it has the name T::promise_type); promise_type may be an alias for another type. Note that this is not related to the std::promise<T> type. Similarly, even though std::future<T> appears to be a future project, it cannot be awaited on. C++11's std::async() receives a unit of work (a lambda) and returns a std::future<T> as a receipt.

A synchronous coroutine generator class, std::generator<Ref, V, Alloc> (where the type parameters are by default V = void and Alloc = void) was introduced, which generates a sequence of elements by resuming the coroutine from which it was obtained. Once a generator is exhausted, then it will match the sentinel object std::default_sentinel. Attempting to increment the generator past exhaustion causes undefined behavior.

import std;

using std::generator;

generator<int> range(int n) noexcept {
    for (int i = 0; i < n; ++i) {
        co_yield i;
    }
}

C++26 adds the std::execution library, a lazy, composable, zero-overhead framework, which starts execution when a receiver connects to a sender and calls std::execution::start().

- std::execution::scheduler<Sch> is an execution engine.
- std::execution::sender<Snd> is an async pipeline.
- std::execution::receiver<Rcv> is a callback/sink.

A task class, std::execution::task<T, Env>, was also added; the type parameters are by default T = void and Env = std::execution::env<>. std::execution::env<Envs...> is itself an object that combines zero or more queryable objects into a single queryable object, with a query() method. It can be co_awaited, but outside of coroutines, it can be called with std::this_thread::sync_wait(), which blocks and returns std::optional<std::tuple<Ts...>>.

import std;

using std::optional;
using std::tuple;
using std::execution::task;
using namespace std::literals;

task<void> simulateWork() {
    std::println("Performing work...");
    std::this_thread::sleep_for(500ms);
    std::println("Work done!");
    co_return;
}

task<int> add(int a, int b) noexcept {
    co_await simulateWork();
    co_return a + b;
}

task<int> test() {
    int ret = co_await add(1, 2);
    std::println("Return {}", ret);
    co_return ret;
}

int main(int argc, char* argv[]) {
    optional<tuple<int>> result = std::this_thread::sync_wait(test());
    std::println("Result: {}", std::get<0>(result.value_or(std::make_tuple(-1))));

    // assign empty tuple a sentinel identifier to check for successful completion
    optional<tuple<>> result = std::this_thread::sync_wait(simulateWork());
    if (result.has_value()) {
        std::println("Work completed successfully.");
    } else {
        std::println("Work failed!");
    }

    return 0;
}

consteval functions, constructors, destructors, and main() may not be coroutines.

If a coroutine throws an exception, it is typically packaged into std::exception_ptr and then propagated back out to the caller's thread through std::rethrow_exception().

== Exception handling ==
Exception handling is used to communicate the existence of a runtime problem or error from where it was detected to where the issue can be handled. It permits this to be done in a uniform manner and separately from the main code, while detecting all errors. Should an error occur, an exception is thrown (raised), which is then caught by the nearest suitable exception handler. The exception causes the current scope to be exited, and also each outer scope (propagation) until a suitable handler is found, calling in turn the destructors of any objects in these exited scopes. At the same time, an exception is presented as an object carrying the data about the detected problem.

Some C++ style guides, such as Google's, LLVM's, and Qt's, forbid the usage of exceptions. In some cases, exceptions cannot be used due to technical reasons. One such example is a critical component of an embedded system, where every operation must be guaranteed to complete within a specified amount of time. This cannot be determined with exceptions as no tools exist to determine the maximum time required for an exception to be handled.

The exception-causing code is placed inside a try block. The exceptions are handled in separate catch blocks (the handlers); each try block can have multiple exception handlers, as it is visible in the example below.

import std;

using std::exception;
using std::out_of_range;
using std::vector;

int main() {
    try {
        vector<int> vec = {3, 4, 3, 1};
        int i = vec.at(10); // Throws an exception, std::out_of_range
    } catch (const out_of_range& e) {
        // An exception handler, catches std::out_of_range, which is thrown by vec.at(10)
        std::println(stderr, "Accessing a non-existent element: {}", e.what());
    } catch (const exception& e) {
        // To catch any other standard library exceptions (they derive from std::exception)
        std::println(stderr, "Exception thrown: {}", e.what());
    }
}

An exception may be thrown using the throw keyword; these exceptions are handled in the usual way.

using std::domain_error;

int addPositiveNumbers(int a, int b) {
    if (a < 0 || b < 0) {
        throw domain_error("Arguments were not non-negative");
    }
    return a + b;
}

A caught exception may be rethrown using a throw; statement, which continues to propagate the thrown object up the stack:

using std::domain_error;
using std::stacktrace;

void tryAdd(int m, int n) {
    try {
        int result = addPositiveNumbers(m, n);
    } catch (const domain_error& e) {
        std::println(stderr, "A domain error was caught: {}", e.what());
        std::println(stderr, "{}", stacktrace::current());
        throw; // equivalent to throw e;
    }
}

Exceptions are usually caught by const reference (i.e. catch (const invalid_argument& e)), because a catch-by-reference avoids an unnecessary copy incurred by a catch-by-value, and also avoids object slicing the exception type. A catch (...) block catches any thrown object, but cannot reference the caught object as this block does not specify its type or give it an identifier; it merely catches any object that crosses its stack frame.

Since C++26, exceptions may be thrown at compile-time (called constexpr exceptions and declared with consteval constructors); the most notable of which is std::meta::exception, the exception type thrown upon a failed reflective function operation.

To count the number of exceptions in the current thread have been thrown (or rethrown) and have not yet entered a catch block, the std::uncaught_exceptions() function is used.

One can also specify that a function will not throw exceptions using the noexcept specifier; a violation of this (i.e. an exception passing the stack frame of a noexcept function) immediately calls std::terminate(). It may also be specified conditionally on another function being noexcept, like so:

void wontThrow() noexcept;
void mightThrow();

// The first noexcept is the noexcept clause, the second is the noexcept operator which evaluates to a Boolean value
void f() noexcept(noexcept(mightThrow()));

Unlike languages like Java, C# and D, which only allow objects of some base exception type to be thrown (for example in Java, only objects that extend java.lang.Throwable, whose direct subclasses are java.lang.Error and java.lang.Exception, may be thrown), C++ allows any object to be thrown and caught. C++ nonetheless used a std::exception class which acts as a root exception type, which standard library exceptions are derived from, and from which user-defined exception types are typically derived from.

Unlike signal handling, in which the handling function is called from the point of failure, exception handling exits the current scope before the catch block is entered, which may be located in the current function or any of the previous function calls currently on the stack.

Prior to C++17 (and first deprecated in C++11), C++ had dynamic exception specifications, which could be seen as similar to Java throws clauses. For instance, the following was valid C++03 code:

#include <stdexcept>

using std::domain_error;
using std::invalid_argument;

// this could be similar to the Java signature
// void performSomeOperation(int a, int b) throws InvalidArgumentException, ArithmeticException;
void performSomeOperation(int a, int b) throw(invalid_argument, domain_error) {
    // ...
}

However, these specifications were not enforced at compile-time. Violations resulted in the standard library function std::unexpected() (Note: Note that this function was removed in C++17, and the name was later reintroduced in C++23 as a result type class std::unexpected<T, E>.) being called. While these were eventually removed in favour of the noexcept specifier, an empty exception specification (throw()) remains legal (and is equivalent to noexcept).

=== Function try block ===
A function may have an additional body, given by a try specifier in its signature and followed by a chain of catch blocks. While for most functions, this is useless as the logic would be better encapsulated within the main body of the function itself, this is particularly useful for constructors and destructors. In particular, because exceptions thrown in the member initialization list of a constructor cannot be caught by a catch block in the constructor body, a function try block must be used.

import std;

using std::exception;

class Foo {
private:
    Bar bar;
public:
    explicit Foo(const Bar& b) try:
        bar{b} {
        std::println("Successfully constructed Foo");
    } catch (const exception& e) {
        std::println("Failed to construct Foo: {}", e.what());
    }
};

== Enumerated types ==
C++ has enumeration types that are directly inherited from C's and work mostly like these, except that an enumeration is a real type in C++, giving added compile-time checking. As with structs, the C++ enum keyword is combined with a typedef, so instead of referring to the type as enum MyEnum, one can simply refer to it as MyEnum. This can be simulated in C using a typedef: typedef enum { VALUE_1, VALUE_2 } MyEnum;

C++11 also provides a second kind of enumeration, called a scoped enumeration. These are type-safe: the enumerators are not implicitly converted to an integer type. Among other things, this allows I/O streaming to be defined for the enumeration type. Another feature of scoped enumerations is that the enumerators must be qualified by the enum name, so usage requires prefixing with the name of the enumeration (e.g., Color::RED for the first enumerator in the example below), unless a using enum declaration (introduced in C++20) has been used to bring the enumerators into the current scope. A scoped enumeration is specified by the keywords enum class (or enum struct, they are identical). For example:

// C-style unscoped enum
enum CardSuit {
    CLUBS,
    DIAMONDS,
    SPADES,
    HEARTS,
};

// C++11-style scoped enum
enum class Color {
    RED,
    GREEN,
    BLUE,
};

int main(int argc, char* argv[]) {
    // Scoped enum
    Color color = Color::RED;

    // Unscoped C-style enum
    CardSuit card1 = CLUBS;
    CardSuit card2 = CardSuit::SPADES; // Can explicitly be scoped

    // Implicit integer conversion
    int suitValue = card1; // implicitly converts to int
    // int colorValue = color; // fails, no implicit conversion
    int colorValue = static_cast<int>(color); // explicit casts required
}

The underlying type of an enumeration is an implementation-defined integral type that is large enough to hold all enumerated values; it does not have to be the smallest possible type. The underlying type can be specified directly.

// Must fit in size and memory layout of the type 'long'
enum class Color : long {
    RED, 
    GREEN, 
    BLUE,
};

C++11 also allows forward declarations in which the enum values are not defined at the same time at the enum type itself. This is only possible if the underlying type is known before knowing of the enumerators. If an underlying type of a scoped enum is not defined, it defaults to int. If later the enumerators do not fit within this type, an error will arise.

// No explicit underlying type for enum class, so int
enum class Color;
// Explicit underlying type
enum class Status : unsigned char;
// Unscoped so underlying type is required
enum Legacy : int;

// Unscoped with no underlying type; error
// enum Broken;

// Forward declarations
void paint(Color c);
Status* getStatus();

// Later definitions
enum class Color {
    RED,
    GREEN,
    BLUE,
};

enum class Status : unsigned char {
    OK,
    ERROR,
};

enum Legacy : int {
    A,
    B,
};

void paint(Color c) { /* ... */ }

== Concepts ==
Concepts are an extension to the templates feature provided by the C++ programming language. Concepts are named Boolean predicates on template parameters, evaluated at compile time. A concept may be associated with a template (class template, function template, member function of a class template, variable template, or alias template), in which case it serves as a constraint: it limits the set of arguments that are accepted as template parameters.

The main uses of concepts are:

- introducing type-checking to template programming
- simplified compiler diagnostics for failed template instantiations
- selecting function template overloads and class template specializations based on type properties
- constraining automatic type deduction

There are five different places in a function template signature where a constraint can be used (labeled below from 1 through 5):

template <Concept1 T>
    requires Concept2<T>
Concept3 auto myFunction(Concept4 auto param) requires Concept5<T>;

- Concept1: A type-constraint. This kind replaces class or typename for declaring a type template parameter. When using a concept instead of the former two the type is constraint.
- Concept2: A requires-clause. Whenever a type-constraint does not work, for example, because the concept takes multiple parameters, a requires-clause can be used to apply more elaborated constraints.
- Concept3, Concept4: A constrained placeholder type. The same syntax is available for placeholder variable aka. auto variable. C++20 added abbreviated function templates which use auto as a placeholder type in the parameter declaration. A constrained placeholder type allows to put constraints on the automatically deduced return type of a function or a variable.
- Concept5: A trailing requires-clause. This form is similar to Concept2 with one notable exception. A trailing requires-clause can be applied to a function in a class template. This allows the function to remain a regular, template-free function, which can be enabled or disabled depending on the functions trailing requires-clause.

The constraint forms Concept1 and Concept2 can be used in all kinds of templates.

== Code inclusion ==
=== Headers ===
Traditionally (prior to C++20), code inclusion in C++ followed the ways of C, in which code was imported into another file using the preprocessor directive #include, which would copy the contents of the file into the other file.

Traditionally, C++ code would be divided between a header file (typically with extension .h, .hpp or .hh) and a source file (typically with extension .cpp or .cc). The header file usually contained declarations of symbols while the source file contained the actual implementation, such as function implementations. This separation was often enforced because #includeing code into another file would result in it being reprocessed for each file it was included by, resulting in increased compilation times if the compiler had to reprocess the same source repeatedly.

Headers often also forced the usage of #include guards or #pragma once to prevent a header from potentially being included into a file multiple times.

The C++ standard library remains accessible through headers, however since C++23 it has been made accessible using modules as well. Even with the introduction of modules, headers continue to play a role in modern C++, as existing codebases have not completely migrated to modules.

==== Header units ====
Headers are traditionally included via textual inclusion by the preprocessor using #include, while modules are included during compilation through import. However, headers may also be imported using import, even if they are not declared as modules – these are called "header units", and they are designed to allow existing codebases to migrate from headers to modules more gradually. The syntax is similar to including a header, with the difference being that #include is replaced with import and a semicolon is placed at the end of the statement. Header units automatically export all symbols, and differ from proper modules in that they allow the emittance of macros, meaning all who import the header unit will obtain its contained macros. This offers minimal breakage between migration to modules. The semantics of searching for the file depending on whether quotation marks or angle brackets are used apply here as well. For instance, one may write import <string>; to import the <string> header, or import "MyHeader.h"; to import the file "MyHeader.h" as a header unit. Most build systems, such as CMake, do not support this feature yet.

=== Binary resource embedding ===
C++26 adds the #embed preprocessor directive, for binary resource inclusion. The #embed directive can be used to embed binary content into a file, even if it is not valid C++ code.

constexpr char ICON_DISPLAY_DATA[] = {
    #embed "art.png"
};

// specify any type which can be initialized form integer constant expressions will do
constexpr char RESET_BLOB[] = {
    #embed "data.bin"
};

// attributes work just as well
alignas(8) constexpr char ALIGNED_DATA_STRING[] = {
    #embed "attributes.xml"
};

int main() {
    return
#embed </dev/urandom> limit(1)
    ;
}

=== Modules ===
Modules do not use the C preprocessor at all, and are instead handled directly by the compiler. A module is declared using export module, and the beginning of the module preamble begins with module;. Exported symbols which will be made accessible to importing translation units are marked export, and a module is imported into the translation unit using import. Modules do not export macros, due to being handled after the preprocessing step.

Modules may also have partitions, which cannot be imported individually but are owned by a larger module.

==== Example ====
A simple example of using modules is as follows:

MyClass.cppm

export module wikipedia.project.Person;

import std;

using std::string;

export namespace wikipedia::project {

class Person {
private:
    string name;
    int age;
public:
    Person(string name, int age):
        name{std::move(name)}, age{age} {}

    string getName() const {
        return name;
    }

    void setName(string name) {
        this->name = std::move(name);
    }

    int getAge() const noexcept {
        return age;
    }

    void setAge(int age) noexcept {
        this->age = age;
    };
};

}

Main.cpp

import std;

import wikipedia.project.Person;

using wikipedia::project::Person;

int main(int argc, char* argv[]) {
    Person me("John Doe", 10);
    me.setAge(15);
    std::println("Hello, {0}! {0} is {1} years old.", me.getName(), me.getAge());
    // prints "Hello, John Doe! John Doe is 15 years old."
}

Another example, of a separate interface file and implementation file, is as follows:

In interface file Foo.cppm:

export module wikipedia.examples.Foo;

import std;

using std::string;

export namespace wikipedia::examples {

class Foo {
private:
    string name;
    int value;
public:
    Foo(const string& name, int value);

    string getName() const noexcept;
    int getValue() const noexcept;
    void displayValue() const;
};

}

In implementation file Foo.cpp:

module wikipedia.examples.Foo;

// note that the 'std' module is already imported in the module interface

using std::string;

namespace wikipedia::examples {

Foo::Foo(string name, int value):
    name{std::move(name)}, value{value} {}

string Foo::getName() const noexcept {
    return name;
}

int Foo::getValue() const noexcept {
    return value;
}

void Foo::displayValue() const {
    std::println("Value in Foo {}: {}", name, value);
}

}

== Attributes ==
Since C++11, C++ has supported attribute specifier sequences. Attributes can be applied to any symbol that supports them, including classes, functions/methods, and variables, and any symbol marked with an attribute will be specifically treated by the compiler as necessary. These can be thought of as similar to Java annotations for providing additional information to the compiler, however they differ in that attributes in C++ are not metadata that is meant to be accessed using reflection. C++26 adds support for annotations for reflection. Furthermore, one cannot create custom attributes in C++, unlike in Java where one may define custom annotations in addition to the standard ones. However, C++ does have implementation/vendor-specific attributes which are non-standard. These typically have a namespace associated with them. For instance, GCC and Clang have attributes under the gnu:: namespace, and all such attributes are of the form [[gnu::*]].

One may apply multiple attributes as a list, for instance [[A, B, C]] (where A, B, and C are attributes). Furthermore, attributes may also accept arguments, like [[A("This is a parameter")]]. The following is an example of using some attributes in C++.

class Integer {
private:
    // indicates that x need not have a
    // unique address from other non-static members
    [[no_unique_address]]
    int x;
public:
    // issues a warning during compilation if
    // the value is discarded/ignored
    [[nodiscard]]
    bool isPositive() const noexcept {
        // indicates this path is more likely
        if (x > 0) [[likely]] {
            return true;
        }
        return false;
    }
};

=== Standard attributes ===
The C++ standard defines the following attributes:

Legend:
: Deprecated
: Removed

Name	Description
[[noreturn]]	Indicates that the specified function will not return to its caller.
[[carries_dependency]]	Indicates that the dependency chain in release-consume std::memory_order propagates in and out of the function. Removed since C++26.
[[deprecated]] [[deprecated("reason")]]	Indicates that the use of the marked symbol is allowed but discouraged/deprecated for the reason specified (if given).
[[fallthrough]]	Indicates that the fall through from the previous case label is intentional.
[[maybe_unused]]	Suppresses compiler warnings on an unused entity.
[[nodiscard]] [[nodiscard("reason")]]	Issues a compiler warning if the return value of the marked symbol is discarded or ignored for the reason specified (if given).
[[likely]] [[unlikely]]	Indicates that the compiler should optimise for the case where a path of execution through a statement is more or less likely to occur than the other(s).
[[no_unique_address]]	Indicates that a non-static data member need not have an address distinct from all other non-static data members of its class.
[[assume(expression)]]	Indicates that the given expression always evaluates to true at a given point, allowing the compiler to make optimisations based on that information.
[[indeterminate]]	Indicates that an object bears an indeterminate value if it is not initialised.
[[unsequenced]]	Indicates that a function is stateless, effectless, idempotent and independent.
[[reproducible]]	Indicates that a function is effectless and idempotent.

=== Scoped attributes ===
As mentioned previously, GCC and Clang have scoped (namespaced) attributes, such as [[gnu::always_inline]], [[gnu::hot]], and [[gnu::const]]. To apply multiple scoped attributes, one may write:

[[nodiscard]]
[[gnu::always_inline]]
[[gnu::const]]
[[gnu::hot]]
inline int f(); // declare f with four attributes
 
[[nodiscard, gnu::always_inline, gnu::const, gnu::hot]]
int f(); // same as above, but uses a single attr specifier that contains four attributes
 
// C++17:
[[nodiscard]]
[[using gnu : always_inline, const, hot]]
int f[[gnu::always_inline]](); // an attribute may appear in multiple specifiers

== Reflection ==
In addition to basic metaprogramming provided in header <type_traits>, C++26 introduces compile-time reflection. Compile-time reflection capabilities can be accessed in header <meta> and declarations are stored in namespace std::meta.

=== Annotations ===
Most declarations can have annotations attached, which are just values associated with that declaration. Like Java annotations, annotations can be accessed using reflection. Annotations are different from attributes as attributes are primarily a means to communicate information to the compiler, while annotations are a feature of reflection and allow arbitrary constants and metadata to be attached, making them customisable to programs, unlike attributes. This allows for bridging the communication between the library API and the user. Consider this example, where some annotations live in the namespace wikipedia::examples:

import std;

using std::string;

using wikipedia::examples::Debug;
using wikipedia::examples::EnumFlag;
using wikipedia::examples::Rename;

enum class [[=EnumFlag]] Toggle : uint8_t {
    OFF, 
    ON,
};

struct [[=Debug]] Person {
    [[=Rename("Full name")]] 
    string fullName;
    int age;
};

The annotations have no initial meaning unless some implementations use those annotations to identify some characteristics and features.

== See also ==
- C++ standard library
- C syntax
- Java syntax
- C# syntax
- Rust syntax
- Cpp2, an experimental alternative syntax for C++
