= Concept (generic programming) =

In generic programming, a concept is a description of supported operations on a type, including syntax and semantics. In this way, concepts are related to abstract types but concepts do not require a subtype relationship.

== Language use ==
The term was in use as early as 1998 for STL, as this was one of the first libraries that extensively used templates. The term concept (and its popularization) is credited to Alexander Stepanov, the primary designer of the STL.

In the C++ 1998 standard, the Concept term was introduced to name just a simple description of the requirements for particular type, usually being a template parameter. It was not encoded in the language explicitly – the concept was expressed only by what operations are attempted on objects of that type and what is expected to work (that is, to compile correctly). There was a proposal to add concepts as an explicit language feature in C++11, though it was rejected as "not ready". C++20 eventually accepted the refined design of concept, though it was a reduced version of its former proposal. Concepts are an example of structural typing.

As generics in Java and C# have some similarities to C++'s templates, the role of concepts there is played by interfaces. However, there is one important difference between concepts and interfaces: when a template parameter is required to implement a particular interface, the matching type can only be a class that implements (explicitly) that interface. This is known as nominal typing. Concepts bring more flexibility because they can be satisfied in two ways:

- explicitly defined as satisfied by using a concept map (defined separately to the type itself, unlike interfaces)
- implicitly defined for "auto concepts", which can be used also for built in types and other types that were not predestined for this use

But the C# language has several constructs where the used type does not need to explicitly implement a defined interface, it is only required to match the respective pattern (however, these patterns are not called concepts). E.g. the foreach iteration statement allows the iterated object to be of any type, as long as it implements an appropriate GetEnumerator method. (Compare with the using statement which requires the resource to implement the System.IDisposable interface.)

The Nim programming language implements concepts as a series of arbitrary compile-time boolean predicates.

Another language implementing something very similar to concepts is Haskell, where the feature is called type classes.

In the Go programming language, interfaces are the equivalent of concepts in C++, which define a set of method signatures. Unlike Java/C# interfaces where classes must declare that they implement the interface, types that satisfy these signatures implement the interface (implicitly).

== Examples ==
=== Total ordering ===
The total ordering concept describes the semantics of the < operator. A type is totally ordered when < is a binary predicate and satisfies the following properties:

- anti-reflexive: !(a < a) for any value a.
- transitive: If a < b and b < c then a < c.
- anti-symmetric: If a < b then !(b < a).
- total: If a != b then a < b or b < a.

Many algorithms rely on these properties to function properly. For example the min() function can be safely defined on totally ordered types:

import std;

using std::totally_ordered;

template <totally_ordered T>
[[nodiscard]]
constexpr T min(T a, T b) noexcept {
    return (b < a) ? b : a;
}

Or, instead of the concept in place of typename, a requires clause can be used. A requires clause is only necessary when the constraints are too complex to be described directly in the typename declaration. Trailing requires clauses can also be used.

template <typename T>
    requires totally_ordered<T>
[[nodiscard]]
constexpr T min(T a, T b) noexcept {
    return (b < a) ? b : a;
}

=== Iterator ===
If a type Iter satisfies the Trivial Iterator concept in C++, and i is of type Iter, the following are valid expressions with corresponding semantics:

- Iter i default construction.
- *i must be convertible to some type T.
- i->m is valid if (*i).m is.

== See also ==
- Protocol (object-oriented programming)
- Concepts (C++)
- Interface (Java)
- Type class
