= John Pork =

Meme

John Pork is an internet meme with a pig’s head and human body. It became popular on TikTok in 2023 after becoming viral in the form of a meme. However, it originally became popular on Instagram in 2018.

== Background ==
John Pork was first posted on Instagram on the 24 th September 2018. Throughout the posts, John Pork was shown to be going to various places, taking selfies and doing various activities as part of the daily life in this fictional scenario. As it has such a unique appearance it stood out from other social media influencers.

John Pork is considered a virtual influencer. In order to make John Pork’s pig head appear in realistic settings, CGI technology was used.

== Popularity on the Internet ==
Despite being on the internet for some time, John Pork became extremely popular in March 2023. It began to gain popularity when people began creating memes with John Pork’s face in them and posting them across social media.

=== Types of Meme ===
A popular meme associated with John Pork is ‘John Pork Is Calling’. This meme displays a call coming in from John Pork. The user is typically presented with two options, to answer the call or not.

This trend became very popular on TikTok. Thousands of variations were made of this trend. The original viral clip was uploaded by TikToker @rover.joe using a CapCut template on the 21 st March 2023.

== Memes ==
Due to John Pork having a unique appearance and being put into humorous scenarios, he became well known within meme culture on the internet.

Popular variations include;

1. ‘John Pork Is Calling’ – A false call from John Pork.
2. ‘John Pork Death Hoax’ – A set of fictional memes stating John Pork had died.
3. ‘John Pork Lore’ – Stories written by fans about John Pork and other internet figures.
4. As a result of these memes, John Pork became more popular than just on his original page on Instagram.
