= Leaf class =

Leaf class may refer to:

- Leaf morphology, the classification of leaves by shape
- Leaf class (programming language), a class that should not be subclassed
- Leaf class tanker, a class of support tanker of the British Royal Fleet Auxiliary
