= Type class =

Type system in computer science

In computer science, a type class is a type system construct that supports ad hoc polymorphism in a programming language. This is achieved by adding constraints to type variables in parametrically polymorphic types. Such a constraint typically involves a type class T and a type variable a, and means that a can only be instantiated to a type whose members support the overloaded operations associated with T.

Type classes were first implemented in the language Haskell after first being proposed by Philip Wadler and Stephen Blott as an extension to eqtypes in Standard ML, and were originally conceived as a way of implementing overloaded arithmetic and equality operators in a principled fashion. In contrast with the "eqtypes" of Standard ML, overloading the equality operator through the use of type classes in Haskell does not need extensive modification of the compiler frontend or the underlying type system.

== Overview ==
Type classes are defined by specifying a set of function or constant names, together with their respective types, that must exist for every type that belongs to the class. In Haskell, types can be parameterized; a type class Eq intended to contain types that admit equality would be declared in the following way:

class Eq a where
  (==) :: a -> a -> Bool
  (/=) :: a -> a -> Bool

where a is one instance of the type class Eq, and a defines the function signatures for 2 functions (the equality and inequality functions), which each take 2 arguments of type a and return a Boolean.

The type variable a has kind $*$ ($*$ is also known as Type in the latest Glasgow Haskell Compiler (GHC) release), meaning that the kind of Eq is

Eq :: Type -> Constraint

The declaration may be read as stating a "type a belongs to type class Eq if there are functions named (==), and (/=), of the appropriate types, defined on it". A programmer could then define a function elem (which determines if an element is in a list) in the following way:

elem :: Eq a => a -> [a] -> Bool
elem y []     = False
elem y (x:xs) = (x == y) || elem y xs

The function elem has the type a -> [a] -> Bool with the context Eq a, which constrains the types which a can range over to those a which belong to the Eq type class. (Haskell => can be called a 'class constraint'.)

Any type t can be made a member of a given type class C by using an instance declaration that defines implementations of all of C's methods for the given type t. For example, if a new data type t is defined, this new type can be made an instance of Eq by providing an equality function over values of type t in any way that is useful. Once this is done, the function elem can be used on [t], that is, lists of elements of type t.

Type classes are different from classes in object-oriented programming languages. Specifically, Eq is not a type: there is no such thing as a value of type Eq.

Type classes are closely related to parametric polymorphism. For example, the type of elem as specified above would be the parametrically polymorphic type a -> [a] -> Bool were it not for the type class constraint "Eq a =>".

== Higher-kinded polymorphism ==
A type class need not take a type variable of kind Type but can take one of any kind. These type classes with higher kinds are sometimes called constructor classes (the constructors referred to are type constructors such as Maybe, rather than data constructors such as Just). An example is the Monad class:

class Monad m where
  return :: a -> m a
  (>>=)  :: m a -> (a -> m b) -> m b

That m is applied to a type variable indicates that it has kind Type -> Type, i.e., it takes a type and returns a type, the kind of Monad is thus:

Monad :: (Type -> Type) -> Constraint

== Multi-parameter type classes ==
Type classes permit multiple type parameters, and so type classes can be seen as relations on types. For example, in the GHC standard library, the class IArray expresses a general immutable array interface. In this class, the type class constraint IArray a e means that a is an array type that contains elements of type e. (This restriction on polymorphism is used to implement unboxed array types, for example.)

Like multimethods, multi-parameter type classes support calling different implementations of a method depending on the types of multiple arguments, and indeed return types. Multi-parameter type classes do not require searching for the method to call on every call at runtime; rather the method to call is first compiled and stored in the dictionary of the type class instance, just as with single-parameter type classes.

Haskell code that uses multi-parameter type classes is not portable as of the Haskell 98 standard, which is not the newest standard. The popular Haskell implementations, GHC and Hugs, support multi-parameter type classes.

== Functional dependencies ==
In Haskell, type classes have been refined to allow the programmer to declare functional dependencies between type parameters—a concept inspired from relational database theory. That is, the programmer can assert that a given assignment of some subset of the type parameters uniquely determines the remaining type parameters. For example, a general monad m which carries a state parameter of type s satisfies the type class constraint Monad.State s m. In this constraint, there is a functional dependency m -> s. This means that for a given monad m of type class Monad.State, the state type accessible from m is uniquely determined. This aids the compiler in type inference, as well as aiding the programmer in type-directed programming.

Simon Peyton Jones has objected to the introduction of functional dependencies in Haskell on grounds of complexity.

== Type classes and implicit parameters ==
Type classes and implicit parameters are very similar in nature, although not quite the same. A polymorphic function with a type class constraint such as:

sum :: Num a => [a] -> a

can be intuitively treated as a function that implicitly accepts an instance of Num:

sum_ :: Num_ a -> [a] -> a

The instance Num_ a is essentially a record that contains the instance definition of Num a. (This is in fact how type classes are implemented under the hood by the Glasgow Haskell Compiler.)

However, there is a crucial difference: implicit parameters are more flexible; different instances of Num Int can be passed. In contrast, type classes enforce the so-called coherence property, which requires that there should only be one unique choice of instance for any given type. The coherence property makes type classes somewhat antimodular, which is why orphan instances (instances that are defined in a module that neither contains the class nor the type of interest) are strongly discouraged. However, coherence adds another level of safety to a language, providing a guarantee that two disjoint parts of the same code will share the same instance.

As an example, an ordered set (of type Set a) requires a total ordering on the elements (of type a) to function. This can be evidenced by a constraint Ord a, which defines a comparison operator on the elements. However, there can be numerous ways to impose a total order. Since set algorithms are generally intolerant of changes in the ordering once a set has been constructed, passing an incompatible instance of Ord a to functions that operate on the set may lead to incorrect results (or crashes). Thus, enforcing coherence of Ord a in this particular scenario is crucial.

Instances (or "dictionaries") in Scala type classes are just ordinary values in the language, rather than a completely separate kind of entity. While these instances are by default supplied by finding appropriate instances in scope to be used as the implicit parameters for explicitly-declared implicit formal parameters, that they are ordinary values means that they can be supplied explicitly, to resolve ambiguity. As a result, Scala type classes do not satisfy the coherence property and are effectively a syntactic sugar for implicit parameters.

This is an example taken from the Cats documentation:

// A type class to provide textual representation
trait Show[A] {
  def show(f: A): String
}

// A polymorphic function that works only when there is an implicit 
// instance of Show[A] available
def log[A](a: A)(implicit s: Show[A]) = println(s.show(a))

// An instance for String
implicit val stringShow = new Show[String] {
  def show(s: String) = s
}

// The parameter stringShow was inserted by the compiler.
scala> log("a string")
a string

Rocq (formerly named Coq), version 8.2 onward, also supports type classes by inferring the appropriate instances. Recent versions of Agda 2 also provide a similar feature, called "instance arguments".

== Other approaches to operator overloading ==
In Standard ML, the mechanism of "equality types" corresponds roughly to Haskell's built-in type class Eq, but all equality operators are derived automatically by the compiler. The programmer's control of the process is limited to designating which type components in a structure are equality types and which type variables in a polymorphic type range over equality types.

SML's and OCaml's modules and functors can play a role similar to that of Haskell's type classes, the principal difference being the role of type inference, which makes type classes suitable for ad hoc polymorphism. The object oriented subset of OCaml is yet another approach which is somewhat comparable to the one of type classes.

== Related notions ==
An analogous notion for overloaded data (implemented in GHC) is that of type family.

In C++, notably C++20, has support for type classes using "concepts". As an illustration, the above mentioned Haskell example of typeclass Eq would be implemented as the following:

import std;

using std::convertible_to;

// equivalent to std::equality_comparable
template <typename T>
concept EqualityComparable = requires (T a, T b) {
    { a == b } -> convertible_to<bool>;
    { a != b } -> convertible_to<bool>;
};

// using concept EqualityComparable:
template <EqualityComparable T>
constexpr bool isEqual(const T& x, const T& y) noexcept {
    return x == y;
}

In Go, an interface can be seen as a type class, and is roughly equivalent to a C++ concept.

In Java and C#, interfaces are similar to type classes, defining an "interface" of methods to implement (see Java interfaces), however these languages also have their own forms of constraining types (for example, C#'s where clauses).

In Clean typeclasses are similar to Haskell, but have a slightly different syntax.

Rust supports traits, which are a limited form of type classes with coherence, and can also be seen as similar to interfaces.

Mercury has type classes, although they are not exactly the same as in Haskell.

In Scala, type classes are a programming idiom that can be implemented with existing language features such as implicit parameters, not a separate language feature per se. Because of the way they are implemented in Scala, it is possible to explicitly specify which type class instance to use for a type at a particular place in the code, in case of ambiguity. However, this is not necessarily a benefit as ambiguous type class instances can be error-prone.

The proof assistant Rocq has also supported type classes in recent versions. Unlike in ordinary programming languages, in Rocq, any laws of a type class (such as the monad laws) that are stated within the type class definition, must be mathematically proved of each type class instance before using them.
