= Type aliasing =

Type aliasing is a feature in some programming languages that allows creating a reference to a type using another name. It does not create a new type hence does not increase type safety. It can be used to shorten a long name. Languages allowing type aliasing include: C++, C# Crystal, D, Dart, Elixir, Elm, F#, Go, Hack, Haskell, Julia, Kotlin, Nim, OCaml, Python, Rust, Scala, Swift and TypeScript.

== Example ==
=== C++ ===
C++ features type aliasing with the using keyword.

using Distance = int;

=== C# ===
C# version 12 and higher supports type aliasing with the using keyword. Earlier versions restrict its use to file-local scope or specific import contexts..

using Distance = int;

=== Crystal ===
Crystal features type aliasing using the alias keyword.

alias Distance = Int32;

=== D ===
D features type aliasing using the alias keyword.

alias Distance = int;

=== Dart ===
Dart features type aliasing using the typedef keyword.

typedef Distance = int;

=== Elixir ===
Elixir features type aliasing using @type.

@type Distance :: integer

=== Elm ===
Elm features type aliasing using type alias.

type alias Distance = Int

=== F# ===
F# features type aliasing using the type keyword.

type Distance = int

=== Go ===
Go features type aliasing using the type keyword and =.

type Distance = int

=== Hack ===
Hack features type aliasing using the newtype keyword. Functionally, this creates a new, distinct type that is incompatible with its underlying type (int). This is stricter than a simple alias, which is generally transparent and interchangeable with the original type.

newtype Distance = int;

=== Haskell ===
Haskell features type aliasing using the type keyword.

type Distance = Int;

=== Julia ===
Julia features type aliasing. The use of const is best practice (though not strictly required for aliasing). It prevents the alias from being rebound to a different type later in the program, ensuring the alias is stable.

const Distance = Int

=== Kotlin ===
Kotlin features type aliasing using the typealias keyword.

typealias Distance = Int

=== Nim ===
Nim features type aliasing.

type
  Distance* = int

=== OCaml ===
OCaml features type aliasing.

type distance = int

=== Python ===
Python features type aliasing.

Vector = list[float]

Type aliases may be marked with TypeAlias to make it explicit that the statement is a type alias declaration, not a normal variable assignment. The use of : TypeAlias (from PEP 613) is not required for the alias to function, but it explicitly tells static type checkers (like Mypy) that the assignment is a type declaration, not a runtime variable assignment.

from typing import TypeAlias

Vector: TypeAlias = list[float]

=== Rust ===
Rust features type aliasing using the type keyword.

type Point = (u8, u8);

=== Scala ===
Scala can create type aliases using opaque types.

object Logarithms:
  opaque type Logarithm = Double

=== Swift ===
Swift features type aliasing using the typealias keyword.

typealias Distance = Int;

=== TypeScript ===
TypeScript features type aliasing using the type keyword.

type Distance = number;

=== Zig ===
Zig features type aliasing by assigning a data type to a constant.

const distance = u32;
