= Interface (object-oriented programming) =

Abstraction of a class

In object-oriented programming, an interface or protocol type (Note: Use of these terms varies by programming language. Java and languages derived from it tend to use interface, while protocol is generally more popular elsewhere.) is a data type that acts as an abstraction of a class. It describes a set of method signatures, the implementations of which may be provided by multiple classes that are otherwise not necessarily related to each other. A class which provides the methods listed in an interface is said to implement the interface, or to adopt the protocol.

Interfaces are useful for encapsulation and reducing coupling. For example, in Java, the java.lang.Comparable interface specifies the method compareTo(). Thus, a sorting method only needs to take objects of types which implement java.lang.Comparable<T> to sort them, without knowing about the inner nature of the class (except that two of these objects can be compared via compareTo()).

== Examples ==
Some programming languages provide explicit language support for interfaces: Ada, C#, D, Dart, Delphi, Go, Java, Logtalk, Object Pascal, Objective-C, OCaml, PHP, Racket, Swift, Python 3.8. In languages supporting multiple inheritance, such as C++, interfaces are abstract classes.

In Java, an implementation of interfaces may look like:

class Animal { /* ... */ }
class Theropod extends Animal { /* ... */ }

interface Flyable {
    void fly();
}

interface Vocal {
    void vocalize();
}

class Bird extends Theropod implements Flyable, Vocal {
    // ...
    @Override
    public void fly() {
        // ...
    }

    @Override
    public void vocalize() {
        // ...
    }
}

In languages without explicit support, interfaces are often still present as conventions; this is known as duck typing. For example, in Python, any class can implement an __iter__() method and be used as an iterable. Classes may also explicitly subclass an ABC, such as collections.abc.Iterable.

Type classes in languages like Haskell, or module signatures in ML and OCaml, are used for many of the same things as are interfaces.

In Rust, interfaces are called traits (see traits). In Rust, a struct does not contain methods, but may add methods through separate impl blocks:

trait Pet {
    fn speak(&self);
}

struct Dog {
    // Structs only contain their fields
    name: String
}

impl Dog {
    // Not from a trait
    fn new(name: String) -> Self {
        Dog { name }
    }
}

impl Pet for Dog {
    // From a trait
    fn speak(&self) {
        println!("{} says 'Woof!'", self.name);
    }
}

fn main() {
    let dog = Dog::new(String::from("Arlo"));
    dog.speak();
}

In C++, there are multiple ways to resemble interfaces. One such way is the Java-style interface, which is done using abstract classes (all of whose methods are pure virtual).

struct Drawable {
    // Destructor must be virtual (for runtime polymorphism)
    virtual ~Drawable() = default;

    // In C++, a class essentially becomes an interface if all methods are pure virtual
    virtual void draw() const = 0;
    virtual double area() const = 0;
};

The other, which resembles Go interfaces, is using concepts. Unlike inheritance, with concepts any type may satisfy a concept (not just classes) so long as it satisfies all of its requirements.

import std;

using std::same_as;
using std::floating_point;

template <typename T>
concept Drawable = requires (T t) {
    { t.draw() } -> same_as<void>; // T::draw must return void
    { t.area() } -> floating_point; // matches any floating-point type
};

== See also ==
- Interface (computing)
- Protocols in Objective-C
- Interface (Java)
- Concept (generic programming)
- Delegation (programming)
- Class (computer science)
- Application programming interface
