= Template (C++) =

Generic type features in C++

Templates are a feature of the C++ programming language that allow functions and classes to operate with generic types. This allows a function or class declaration to reference via a generic variable another different class (built-in or newly declared data type) without creating a full declaration for each of these different classes.

In plain terms, a templated class or function would be the equivalent of (before "compiling") copying and pasting the templated block of code where it is used, and then replacing the template parameter with the actual one.

The C++ Standard Library provides many useful functions within a framework of connected templates.

Major inspirations for C++ templates were the parameterized modules provided by the language CLU and the generics provided by Ada.

== Technical overview ==
There are three kinds of templates: function templates, class templates and, since C++14, variable templates. Since C++11, templates may be either variadic or non-variadic; in earlier versions of C++ they are always non-variadic.

C++ Templates are Turing complete.

=== Function templates ===
A function template behaves like a function except that the template can accept arguments of various types, enabling type-generic behavior (see example). In other words, a function template represents a family of functions. The format for declaring function templates with type parameters is:

template <class Identifier> Declaration;
template <typename Identifier> Declaration;

Both expressions have the same meaning and behave in exactly the same way. The latter form was introduced to avoid confusion, since a type parameter need not be a class until C++20. (It can be a basic type such as int or double.)

For example, the C++ Standard Library contains the function template max(x, y) which returns the larger of x and y. That function template could be defined like this:

template <typename T>
[[nodiscard]]
constexpr T& max(const T& a, const T& b) noexcept {
    return a < b ? b : a;
}

This single function definition works with many data types. Specifically, it works with all data types for which < (the less-than operator) is defined and returns a value with a type convertible to bool. The usage of a function template saves space in the source code file in addition to limiting changes to one function description and making the code easier to read.

An instantiated function template usually produces the same object code, though, compared to writing separate functions for all the different data types used in a specific program. For example, if a program uses both an int and a double version of the max() function template above, the compiler will create an object code version of max() that operates on int arguments and another object code version that operates on double arguments. The compiler output will be identical to what would have been produced if the source code had contained two separate non-templated versions of max(), one written to handle int and one written to handle double.

Here is how the function template could be used:

import std;

int main() {
    // This will call max<int> by implicit argument deduction.
    std::println("{}", std::max(3, 7));

    // This will call max<double> by implicit argument deduction.
    std::println("{}", std::max(3.0, 7.0));

    // We need to explicitly specify the type of the arguments; 
    // although std::type_identity could solve this problem...
    std::println("{}", max<double>(3, 7.0));
}

In the first two cases, the template argument T is automatically deduced by the compiler to be int and double, respectively. In the third case automatic deduction of max(3, 7.0) would fail because the type of the parameters must in general match the template arguments exactly. Therefore, we explicitly instantiate the double version with max<double>().

This function template can be instantiated with any copy-constructible type for which the expression y < x is valid. For user-defined types, this implies that the less-than operator (<) must be overloaded in the type.

==== Dependent member templates ====
Consider the parameter obj in the following:

template <typename T>
void callFoo(T& obj) {
    // ...
}

Suppose inside this function, one would like to call a templated method named foo<X> (for some other type X unrelated to T that may be a specific type or another template parameter). Writing something like obj.foo<X>() would be illegal, as the compiler will parse it instead as obj.foo < X > (); or rather (obj.foo < X) > (), which is a syntax error. To properly clarify that the name foo is a template, it must be prefixed with the keyword template, for instance in the below example where X is the type int:

template <typename T>
void callFoo(T& obj) {
    obj.template foo<int>();
}

This line may appear as if it is accessing a field inside obj named "template", but this is in fact a compiler hint to indicate to the parser that the name immediately following it is a template function. (Note: A syntax in Java that appears to resemble the obj.template in C++ is X.class; this is used to create a java.lang.Class<X> instance, and despite the resemblance is not related; in addition, if the type X represents a generic in Java then the expression is not even legal as Java generics are type-erased at runtime.)

==== Abbreviated function templates ====
Since C++20, using auto or concept auto (for a concept) in any of the parameters of a function declaration, that declaration becomes an abbreviated function template declaration. Such a declaration declares a function template and one invented template parameter for each placeholder is appended to the template parameter list:

template <typename T>
void f1(T x);
// equivalent to:
void g1(auto x);

<Concept1 T>
void f2(T x);
// equivalent to (if Concept1 is a concept):
void g2(Concept1 auto x);

template <Concept2... Ts>
void f3(Ts... xs)
// equivalent to (if Concept2 is a concept):
void g3(Concept2 auto... xs);

template <Concept2 T>
void f4(T... xs);
// equivalent to (if Concept2 is a concept):
void g4(Concept2 auto xs, ...);

template <Concept3 T, Concept4 U>
void f5(const T* t, U& u);
// equivalent to (if Concept3 and Concept4 are concepts):
void g5(const Concept3 auto* t, Concept4 auto& u);

Constraining the max() using concepts could look something like this:

using std::totally_ordered;

// in typename declaration:
template <totally_ordered T>
[[nodiscard]]
constexpr T max(T x, T y) noexcept {
    return x < y ? y : x;
}

// in requires clause:
template <typename T>
    requires totally_ordered<T>
[[nodiscard]]
constexpr T max(T x, T y) noexcept {
    return x < y ? y : x;
}

==== Template deduction guides ====
C++17 introduces "template deduction guides", which are user-defined rules that indicate to the compiler how to deduce template arguments for a class template from its constructor arguments. This feature is called "class template argument deduction".

For example, a "pair" class (resembling std::pair<T, U>) might look something like the following, with a deduction guide.

template <typename T, typename U>
struct Pair {
    T first;
    U second;
};

template <typename T, typename U>
Pair(T, U) -> Pair<T, U>;

// Before C++17, written as:
Pair<int, double> p(1, 2.5);
// After C++17:
Pair p(1, 2.5); // deduced to Pair<int, double>

=== Class templates ===
A class template provides a specification for generating classes based on parameters. Class templates are generally used to implement containers. A class template is instantiated by passing a given set of types to it as template arguments. The C++ Standard Library contains many class templates, in particular the containers adapted from the Standard Template Library, such as std::vector<T>.

=== Variable templates ===
In C++14, templates can be also used for variables, as in the following example:

template <typename T> 
constexpr T PI = T{3.141592653589793238462643383L}; // (Almost) from std::numbers::pi

=== Non-type template parameters ===
Although templating on types, as in the examples above, is the most common form of templating in C++, it is also possible to template on values. Thus, for example, a class declared with

template <int K>
class MyClass;

can be instantiated with a specific int.

As a real-world example, the standard library fixed-size array type std::array<T, N> is templated on both a type (representing the type of object that the array holds) and a number which is of type size_t (representing the number of elements the array holds). To create a class Array<T, N> equivalent to std::array<T, N>, it can be declared as follows:

template <class T, size_t N> 
struct Array;

and an array of six chars might be declared:

Array<char, 6> myArray;

=== Template specialization ===
When a function or class is instantiated from a template, a specialization of that template is created by the compiler for the set of arguments used, and the specialization is referred to as being a generated specialization.

=== Explicit template specialization ===
Sometimes, the programmer may decide to implement a special version of a function (or class) for a given set of template type arguments which is called an explicit specialization. In this way certain template types can have a specialized implementation that is optimized for the type or a more meaningful implementation than the generic implementation.

- If a class or variable template is specialized by a subset of its parameters it is called partial template specialization (function templates cannot be partially specialized).
- If all of the parameters are specialized it is a full specialization.

Explicit specialization is used when the behavior of a function or class for particular choices of the template parameters must deviate from the generic behavior: that is, from the code generated by the main template, or templates. For example, the template definition below defines a specific implementation of max() for arguments of type const char*:

import std;

template <> 
[[nodiscard]]
constexpr const char* max(const char* a, const char* b) noexcept {
    // Normally, the result of a direct comparison
    // between two C strings is undefined behaviour;
    // using std::strcmp makes defined.
    return std::strcmp(a, b) > 0 ? a : b;
}

=== Variadic templates ===
C++11 introduced variadic templates, which can take a variable number of arguments in a manner somewhat similar to variadic functions such as std::printf.

using std::format_string;
using std::ofstream;

enum class Level { ... };

ofstream logFile{"logfile.txt"};

template <typename... Args>
void log(const format_string<Args...>& fmt, Args&&... args) {
    std::println(logFile, fmt, args...);
}

Because only C-style variadic parameters are supported in C++, the only way to get type-safe variadic functions (like in Java) is through variadic templates.

=== Template aliases ===
C++11 introduced template aliases, which act like parameterized typedefs.

The following code shows renaming std::map to TreeMap and std::unordered_map to HashMap, as well as creating an alias StringHashMap for std::unordered_map<std::string, int>. This allows, for example, StringHashMap<int> to be used as shorthand for std::unordered_map<std::string, int>.

using String = std::string;

// allowing optional specialization of hash functions, allocators, etc.
template <
    typename K, 
    typename V, 
    typename Compare = std::less<K>, 
    typename Alloc = std::allocator<std::pair<const K, T>>
>
using TreeMap = std::map<K, V, Compare, Alloc>;

template <
    typename K, 
    typename V, 
    typename HashFn = std::hash<K>, 
    typename KeyEq = std::equal_to<K>, 
    typename Alloc = std::allocator<std::pair<const K, T>>
> 
using HashMap = std::unordered_map<K, V, HashFn, KeyEq, Alloc>;

// or, only allowing K and V to be specialized:
template <typename K, typename V>
using TreeMap = std::map<K, V>;

template <typename K, typename V> 
using HashMap = std::unordered_map<K, V>;

// Defining StringHashMap<V> = HashMap<String, V>
template <typename V>
using StringHashMap = HashMap<String, V>;

StringHashMap<int> myMap = {
    {"Apple", 5},
    {"Banana", 6},
};

=== Constrained templates ===
Since C++20, templates can be constrained similarly to generics wildcards in Java, Go interfaces, or C# and Rust where clauses. This is done using requires clauses and concepts; requires clauses are simply any set of boolean predicates evaluated at compile time; while a concept is a specific named type constraint declared with the keyword concept.

For example, this code uses std::derived_from<Derived, Base> as an upper inheritance bound. A class satisfies this concept if it inherits from Player, and classes that do not cannot be used as the template parameter in processListOfPlayers().

import std;

using std::derived_from;
using std::vector;

class Player {
    // ...
};

// T is required to be a type whose inheritance upper bound is Player,
// blocking any type that does not inherit from Player
template <derived_from<Player> T>
void processListOfPlayers(const vector<T>& players) {
    // ...
}

Concepts can be used to implement a form of type-safe variadic parameters. For example, the Java signature <T> void fn(T... args);

using std::same_as;

template <typename T>
void fn(same_as<T> auto... args) {
    // ...
}

Furthermore, to constrain these to any specific type, the std::same_as<T, U> and std::convertible_to<T, U> concepts may be used. For instance, the Java signatures void foo(int... args); and void bar(String... args); could be written as void foo(same_as<int> auto... args); and void bar(convertible_to<string> auto... args); respectively.

=== Exported templates ===
In C++03, "exported templates" were added to C++. These were later removed in C++11, due to very few compilers actually supporting the feature. The only compiler known to support exported templates was Comeau C/C++. Among the cited reasons for removal were:

- Expensive or complex to implement
- Little benefit to most users as well as little interest
- Difficult to use
- Changes to meanings of existing language features
- Restricting the future development of C++

An "exported template" is essentially a class template whose static data members and non-inline methods are exported; this essentially allowed a template's declaration to be separated from its implementation. It must be marked by the keyword export. What distinguishes an "exported template" is the fact that it does not need to be defined in a translation unit that uses the template. For example (in C++03):

File1.cpp:

#include <iostream>

static void trace() {
    std::cout << "File 1" << std::endl;
}

export template <typename T>
T min(const T& x, const T& y);

int main() {
    trace();
    std::cout << min(2, 3) << std::endl;
}

File2.cpp:

#include <iostream>

static void trace() {
    std::cout << "File 2" << std::endl;
}

export template <typename T>
T min(const T& x, const T& y) {
    trace();
    return a < b ? a : b;
}

With the introduction of modules in C++20, the keyword export was re-purposed to mean exporting a symbol as accessible from an imported module. The compilation speed benefits intended to be offered by exported templates are offered by modules anyway, making the feature essentially obsolete and superseded by modules.

=== Spliced templates ===
In C++26 reflection, the template keyword must be used when splicing a std::meta::info to designate a template in source code.

using std::meta::info;

template <size_t N>
struct Length {
    static constexpr size_t SIZE = N;
};

constexpr info clazz = ^^Length;
constexpr size_t lengthOfInterest = template [:clazz:]<10uz>::SIZE;

== Generic programming features in other languages ==
Initially, the concept of templates was not included in some languages, such as Java and C# 1.0. Java generics mimic the behavior of templates, but Java generics are not reified and generic information is stripped at runtime. C# added generics (parameterized types) in .NET 2.0. The generics in Ada predate C++ templates.

Although C++ templates, Java generics, and .NET generics are often considered similar, generics only mimic the basic behavior of C++ templates. Some of the advanced template features utilized by libraries such as Boost and STLSoft, and implementations of the STL, for template metaprogramming (explicit or partial specialization, default template arguments, template non-type arguments, template template arguments, ...) are unavailable with generics.

In C++ templates, compile-time cases were historically performed by pattern matching over the template arguments. For example, the template base class in the Factorial example below is implemented by matching 0 rather than with an inequality test, which was previously unavailable. However, the arrival in C++11 of standard library features such as std::conditional has provided another, more flexible way to handle conditional template instantiation.

// Induction
template <uint64_t N> 
struct Factorial {
    static constexpr uint64_t VALUE = N * Factorial<N - 1>::VALUE;
};

// Base case via template specialization:
template <> 
struct Factorial<0> {
    static constexpr uint64_t VALUE = 1;
};

With these definitions, one can compute, say 6! at compile time using the expression Factorial<6>::VALUE.

Alternatively, constexpr since C++11, and if constexpr since C++17 can be used to calculate such values directly using a function at compile-time:

template <uint64_t N>
[[nodiscard]]
constexpr uint64_t factorial() noexcept {
    if constexpr (N <= 1) {
        return 1;
    } else {
        return N * factorial<N - 1>();
    }
}

Because of this, template meta-programming is now mostly used to do operations on types.

== See also ==
- Template metaprogramming
- Metaprogramming
- Monomorphization
- Generic programming
- Generics in Java
- Header-only
- Substitution failure is not an error
- Curiously recurring template pattern
- List of C++ template libraries
