= Project Valhalla =

Project Valhalla may refer to:

- Project Valhalla (Java language), a project to develop new features for the Java programming language
- Valhalla Project, a fictional project in the Max Payne video game
