= Immutable interface =

Design pattern in object-oriented programming

In object-oriented programming, "immutable interface" is a pattern for designing an immutable object. The immutable interface pattern involves defining a type which does not provide any methods which mutate state. Objects which are referenced by that type are not seen to have any mutable state, and appear immutable.

== Example ==
=== Java ===
Consider a Java class which represents a two-dimensional point.

public class Point2D {
    private int x;
    private int y;
    public Point2D(int x, int y) { this.x = x; this.y = y; }

    public int getX() { return this.x; }
    public int getY() { return this.y; }

    public void setX(int newX) { this.x = newX; }
    public void setY(int newY) { this.y = newY; }
}

The class Point2D is mutable: its state can be changed after construction, by invoking either of the setter methods (setX() or setY()).

An immutable interface for Point2D could be defined as:

public interface ImmutablePoint2D {
    public int getX();
    public int getY();
}

By making Point2D implement ImmutablePoint2D, client code could now reference a type which does not have mutating methods, and thus appears immutable. This is demonstrated in the following example:

ImmutablePoint2D point = new Point2D(0,0);  // a concrete instance of Point2D is referenced by the immutable interface
int x = point.getX(); // valid method call
int y = point.setX(42); // compile error: the method setX() does not exist on type ImmutablePoint2D

By referencing only the immutable interface, it is not valid to call a method which mutates the state of the concrete object.

== Advantages ==
- Clearly communicates the immutable intent of the type.
- Unlike types implementing the Immutable Wrapper pattern, does not need to "cancel out" mutating methods by issuing a "No Operation" instruction, or throwing a runtime exception when a mutating method is invoked.

== Disadvantages ==
- It is possible for instances referenced by the immutable interface type to be cast to their concrete, mutable type, and have their state mutated. For example:
  public void mutate(ImmutablePoint2D point) {
    ((Point2D)point).setX(42); // this call is legal, since the type has
                               // been converted to the mutable Point2D class
}
- Concrete classes have to explicitly declare they implement the immutable interface. This may not be possible if the concrete class "belongs to" third-party code, for instance, if it is contained within a library.
- The object is not really immutable and hence not suitable for use in data structures relying on immutability like hash maps. And the object could be modified concurrently from the "mutable side".
- Some compiler optimizations available for immutable objects might not be available for mutable objects.

== Alternatives ==
An alternative to the immutable interface pattern is the immutable wrapper pattern.

Persistent data structures are effectively immutable while allowing modified views of themselves.
