= Primitive wrapper class in Java =

Wrapper classes for primitive types in the Java language

In object-oriented programming, a wrapper class is a class that encapsulates types, so that those types can be used to create object instances and methods in another class that needs those types. So a primitive wrapper class is a wrapper class that encapsulates, hides or wraps data types from the eight primitive data types, so that these can be used to create instantiated objects with methods in another class or in other classes. The primitive wrapper classes are found in the Java API.

Primitive wrapper classes are used to create an java.lang.Object that needs to represent primitive types in java.util.Collection classes (i.e., in the Java API), in the java.util package and in the java.lang.reflect reflection package. Collection classes are Java API-defined classes that can store objects in a manner similar to how data structures like arrays store primitive data types like int, double, long or char, etc., but arrays store primitive data types while collections actually store objects.

The primitive wrapper classes and their corresponding primitive types are:

Primitive type	Wrapper class	Constructor arguments	JVM letter
byte	java.lang.Byte	byte or java.lang.String	B
short	java.lang.Short	short or java.lang.String	S
int	java.lang.Integer	int or java.lang.String	I
long	java.lang.Long	long or java.lang.String	J
float	java.lang.Float	float, double or java.lang.String	F
double	java.lang.Double	double or java.lang.String	D
char	java.lang.Character	char	C
boolean	java.lang.Boolean	boolean or java.lang.String	Z
void	java.lang.Void	None (unconstructible)	V

== The difference between wrapper classes and primitive types ==
Primitive wrapper classes are not the same thing as primitive types. Whereas variables, for example, can be declared in Java as data types double, short, int, etc., the primitive wrapper classes create instantiated objects and methods that inherit but hide the primitive data types, not like variables that are assigned the data type values.

Therefore, the term primitive wrapper class does not mean that wrapper classes are primitive types. It should be understood to be a class that wraps primitive types. Wrapper classes can be used to store the same value as of a primitive type variable but the instances/objects of wrapper classes themselves are non-primitive. We cannot say that Wrapper classes themselves are Primitive types. They just wrap the primitive types.

The java.lang.Byte, java.lang.Short, java.lang.Integer, java.lang.Long, java.lang.Float, and Double wrapper classes are all subclasses of the java.lang.Number class.

The arbitrary precision numeric classes java.math.BigInteger and java.math.BigDecimal are not one of the primitive wrapper classes but are immutable.

== Atomic wrapper classes ==
With Java 5.0, additional wrapper classes were introduced in the java.util.concurrent.atomic package. These classes are mutable and cannot be used as a replacement for the regular wrapper classes. Instead, they provide atomic operations for addition, increment and assignment.

The atomic wrapper classes and their corresponding types are:

Type	Wrapper class
int	java.util.concurrent.AtomicInteger
long	java.util.concurrent.AtomicLong
boolean	java.util.concurrent.AtomicBoolean
V (any reference type)	java.util.concurrent.AtomicReference<V>

The java.util.concurrent.AtomicInteger and java.util.concurrent.AtomicLong classes are subclasses of the java.lang.Number class. The generic type java.util.concurrent.AtomicReference<V> class accepts the type parameter V that specifies the type of the object reference.

== See also ==
- java.lang
- java.lang.reflect
- Java programming language
- Java syntax
- Java compiler
- Boxing (computer programming)
- Value type and reference type
