= Const =

Type qualifier denoting the data as being read-only

In some programming languages, const is a type qualifier (a keyword applied to a data type) that indicates that the data is read-only. While this can be used to declare constants, const in the C family of languages differs from similar constructs in other languages in that it is part of the type, and thus has complicated behavior when combined with pointers, references, composite data types, and type-checking. In other languages, the data is not in a single memory location, but copied at compile time for each use. Languages which use it include C, C++, D, JavaScript, Julia, and Rust.

== Introduction ==
When applied in an object declaration, (Note: Formally when the const is part of the outermost derived type in a declaration; pointers complicate discussion.) it indicates that the object is a constant: its value may not be changed, unlike a variable. This basic use – to declare constants – has parallels in many other languages.

However, unlike in other languages, in the C family of languages the const is part of the type, not part of the object. For example, in C, const int x = 1; declares an object x of const int type – the const is part of the type, as if it were parsed "(const int) x" – while in Ada, X : constant INTEGER := 1_ declares a constant (a kind of object) X of INTEGER type: the constant is part of the object, but not part of the type.

This has two subtle results. Firstly, const can be applied to parts of a more complex type – for example, const int* const x; declares a constant pointer to a constant integer, while const int* x; declares a variable pointer to a constant integer, as if it was parsed "(const int)* x". If the order is reversed, as in int* const x; , then it declares a constant pointer to a variable integer, as if it was parsed as "const (int*)". In addition, because const is part of the type, it must match as part of type-checking. For example, the following C++ code is invalid:

void f(int& x);
// ...
const int i;
f(i);

because the argument to f must be a variable integer, but i is a constant integer. This matching is a form of program correctness, and is known as const-correctness. This allows a form of programming by contract, where functions specify as part of their type signature whether they modify their arguments or not, and whether their return value is modifiable or not. This type-checking is primarily of interest in pointers and references – not basic value types like integers – but also for composite data types or templated types such as containers. It is concealed by the fact that the const can often be omitted, due to type coercion (implicit type conversion) and C being call-by-value (C++ and D are either call-by-value or call-by-reference). Although a constant variable may not be passed to a function not explicitly expecting a constant value, type coercion allows variables not declared as constant to be passed to functions expecting constant variables. The following C++ code is valid:

void f(const int& x);
// ...
int i = 10;
f(i);

because although f expects a constant integer, and i is a variable integer, type coercion allows i to be coerced into a const int for this function call, and will enforce constant rules within f's scope, while i remains mutable outside it.

== Consequences ==
The idea of const-ness does not imply that the variable as it is stored in computer memory is unwritable. Rather, const-ness is a compile-time construct that indicates what a programmer should do, not necessarily what they can do. Note, however, that in the case of predefined data (such as const char* string literals), C const is often unwritable.

== Distinction from constants ==
While a constant does not change its value while the program is running, an object declared const may indeed change its value while the program is running. A common example are read only registers within embedded systems like the current state of a digital input. The data registers for digital inputs are often declared as const and volatile. The content of these registers may change without the program doing anything (volatile) but it would be ill-formed for the program to attempt write to them (const).

== Other uses ==
In addition, a (non-static) member-function can be declared as const. In this case, the this pointer inside such a function is of type const T* rather than merely of type T*. This means that non-const functions for this object cannot be called from inside such a function, nor can member variables be modified. In C++, a member variable can be declared as mutable, indicating that this restriction does not apply to it. In some cases, this can be useful, for example with caching, reference counting, and data synchronization. In these cases, the logical meaning (state) of the object is unchanged, but the object is not physically constant since its bitwise representation may change.

== Syntax ==
In C, C++, and D, all data types, including those defined by the user, can be declared const, and const-correctness dictates that all variables or objects should be declared as such unless they need to be modified. Such proactive use of const makes values "easier to understand, track, and reason about", and it thus increases the readability and comprehensibility of code and makes working in teams and maintaining code simpler because it communicates information about a value's intended use. This can help the compiler as well as the developer when reasoning about code. It can also enable an optimizing compiler to generate more efficient code.

=== Simple data types ===
For simple non-pointer data types, applying the const qualifier is straightforward. It can go on either side of some types for historical reasons (for example, const char foo = 'a'; is equivalent to char const foo = 'a';). On some implementations, using const twice (for instance, const char const or char const const) generates a warning but not an error.

=== Pointers and references ===
For pointer and reference types, the meaning of const is more complicated – either the pointer itself, or the value being pointed to, or both, can be const. Further, the syntax can be confusing. A pointer can be declared as a const pointer to writable value, or a writable pointer to a const value, or const pointer to const value. A const pointer cannot be reassigned to point to a different object from the one it is initially assigned, but it can be used to modify the value that it points to (called the pointee). Reference variables in C++ are an alternate syntax for const pointers. A pointer to a const object, on the other hand, can be reassigned to point to another memory location (which should be an object of the same type or of a convertible type), but it cannot be used to modify the memory that it is pointing to. A const pointer to a const object can also be declared and can neither be used to modify the pointee nor be reassigned to point to another object. The following code illustrates these subtleties:

void foo(int* p, const int* cp, int* const pc, const int* const cpc) {
    *p = 0; // OK: modifies the pointed to data
    p = NULL; // OK: modifies the pointer

    *cp = 0; // Error! Cannot modify the pointed to data
    cp = NULL; // OK: modifies the pointer

    *pc = 0; // OK: modifies the pointed to data
    pc = NULL; // Error! Cannot modify the pointer

    *cpc = 0; // Error! Cannot modify the pointed to data
    cpc = NULL; // Error! Cannot modify the pointer
}

==== C convention ====
Following usual C convention for declarations, declaration follows use, and the * in a pointer is written on the pointer, indicating dereferencing. For example, in the declaration int *p, the dereferenced form *p is an int, while the reference form p is a pointer to an int. Thus const modifies the name to its right. The C++ convention is instead to associate the * with the type, as in int* p, and read the const as modifying the type to the left. const int * cp can thus be read as "*cp is a const int" (the value is constant), or "cp is a const int *" (the pointer is a pointer to a constant integer). Thus:

int* p; // *p is an int value
const int* cp; // *cp is a constant int
int* const pc; // pc is a constant int*
const int* const cpc; // cpc is a constant pointer and points to a constant value

==== C++ convention ====
Following C++ convention of analyzing the type, not the value, a rule of thumb is to read the declaration from right to left. Thus, everything to the left of the star can be identified as the pointed type and everything to the right of the star are the pointer properties. For instance, in our example above, const int* can be read as a writable pointer that refers to a non-writable integer, and int* const can be read as a non-writable pointer that refers to a writable integer.

A more generic rule to aid in understanding complex declarations and definitions works like this:

1. find the identifier of the declaration in question
2. read as far as possible to the right (i.e., until the end of the declaration or to the next closing parenthesis, whichever comes first)
3. back up to where reading began, and read backwards to the left (i.e., until the beginning of the declaration or to the open-parenthesis matching the closing parenthesis found in the previous step)
4. once reaching the beginning of the declaration, finish. If not, continue at step 2, beyond the closing parenthesis that was matched last.

Here is an example:

Part of expression	double (**const (*fun(int))(double))[10]	Meaning (reading downwards)
Identifier	fun	fun is a ...
Read to the right	(int))	function expecting an int...
Find the matching (	(*	returning a pointer to ...
Continue right	(double))	a function expecting a double...
Find the matching (	(**const	returning a constant pointer to a pointer to ...
Continue right	[10]	blocks of 10 ...
Read to the left	double	doubles.

When reading to the left, it is important to read the elements from right to left. So an const int* becomes a pointer to a const int and not a const pointer to an int.

In some cases C/C++ allows the const keyword to be placed to the right of the type. Here are some examples:

const int* cp; // equivalent to int const* cp,
const int* const cpc; // equivalent to int const* const cpc

Although C/C++ allows such definitions (which closely match the English language when reading the definitions from left to right), the compiler still reads the definitions according to the abovementioned procedure: from right to left. But putting const before what must be constant quickly introduces mismatches between what is intended to be written and what the compiler decides was written. Consider pointers to pointers:

int** pp; // a pointer to a pointer to ints
const int** cpp; // a pointer to a pointer to constant int value (not a pointer to a constant pointer to ints)
int* const* pcp; // a pointer to a const pointer to int values (not a constant pointer to a pointer to ints)
int** const ppc; // a constant pointer to pointers to ints (ppc, the identifier, being const makes no sense)
const int** const cppc; // a constant pointer to pointers to constant int values

Some choose to write the pointer symbol on the variable, reasoning that attaching it to the type is potentially confusing, as it strongly suggests a pointer "type" which is not necessarily the case in C.

// two ways:
int* a; // left-aligned asterisk
int *a; // right-aligned asterisk

int* a, b; // confusing (a is a pointer to an int but b is merely an int)
int *a, b; // a is a pointer to an int and b is an int

int* a, *b; // ugly (a and b are both pointers to ints, but this is an awkward way to write)
int *a, *b;

Note that in C#, right-alignment of the asterisk is illegal.

int *a, *b; // illegal in C#
int* a, b; // declares two int*

Bjarne Stroustrup's FAQ recommends only declaring one variable per line if using the C++ convention, to avoid this issue.

The same considerations apply to defining references and rvalue references:

int i = 22;
const int& cr = i;
const int& cr2 = i, cr3 = i; 
// confusing:
// cr2 is a reference, but cr3 isn't:
// cr3 is a constant int initialized with i's value

// error: as references can't change anyway.
int& const rc = myInt;

// C++:
int&& rref = int(5), value = 10; // confusing: rref is an rvalue reference, but value is a mere int.
int &&rref = int(5), value = 10;

More complicated declarations are encountered when using multidimensional arrays and references (or pointers) to pointers. Although it is sometimes argued that such declarations are confusing and error-prone and that they therefore should be avoided or be replaced by higher-level structures, the procedure described at the top of this section can always be used without introducing ambiguities or confusion.

=== Parameters and variables ===
const can be declared both on function parameters and on variables (static or automatic, including global or local). The interpretation varies between uses. A const static variable (global variable or static local variable) is a constant, and may be used for data like mathematical constants, such as const double PI = 3.14159 – realistically longer, or overall compile-time parameters. A const automatic variable (non-static local variable) means that single assignment is happening, though a different value may be used each time, such as const int x_squared = x * x. A const parameter in pass-by-reference means that the referenced value is not modified – it is part of the contract – while a const parameter in pass-by-value (or the pointer itself, in pass-by-reference) does not add anything to the interface (as the value has been copied), but indicates that internally, the function does not modify the local copy of the parameter (it is a single assignment). For this reason, some favor using const in parameters only for pass-by-reference, where it changes the contract, but not for pass-by-value, where it exposes the implementation.

== C++ ==
In C++, there are four different kinds of const:

- const, the traditional runtime constant
- constexpr, a constant or expression which can be evaluated at compile time (see constexpr)
- consteval, which declares that any call to a function must produce a value which is a compile-time expression
- constinit, which declares that the expression has static (constant) initialisation

=== Methods ===
In order to take advantage of the design by contract approach for user-defined types (structs and classes), which can have methods as well as member data, the programmer may tag instance methods as const if they don't modify the object's data members. Applying the const qualifier to instance methods thus is an essential feature for const-correctness, and is not available in many other object-oriented languages such as Java and C# or in Microsoft's C++/CLI or Managed Extensions for C++. While const methods can be called by const and non-const objects alike, non-const methods can only be invoked by non-const objects. The const modifier on an instance method applies to the object pointed to by the "this" pointer, which is an implicit argument passed to all instance methods. Thus having const methods is a way to apply const-correctness to the implicit "this" pointer argument just like other arguments.

This example illustrates:

class Integer {
private:
    int i;
public:
    // note the const tag
    [[nodiscard]]
    int get() const noexcept { 
        return i; 
    }

    // Note the lack of "const"
    void set(int j) noexcept { 
        i = j; 
    }
};

void foo(Integer& nonConstInteger, const Integer& constInteger) {
    int y = nonConstInteger.get(); // OK
    int x = constInteger.get(); // OK: get() is const

    nonConstInteger.set(10); // OK: nonConstInteger is modifiable
    constInteger.set(10); // Error! set() is a non-const method and constInteger is a const-qualified object
}

In the above code, the implicit "this" pointer to set() has the type "Integer* const"; whereas the "this" pointer to get() has type "Integer const* const", indicating that the method cannot modify its object through the "this" pointer.

Often the programmer will supply both a const and a non-const method with the same name (but possibly quite different uses) in a class to accommodate both types of callers. Consider:

import std;

using std::array;

class IntegerArray {
private:
    array<int, 100> data;
public:
    [[nodiscard]]
    int& get(int i) noexcept { 
        return data[i]; 
    }

    [[nodiscard]]
    int const& get(int i) const noexcept { 
        return data[i]; 
    }
};

void foo(IntegerArray& a, const IntegerArray& ca) {
    // Get a reference to an array element
    // and modify its referenced value.

    a.get(5) = 42; // OK! (Calls: int& IntegerArray::get(int))
    ca.get(5) = 42; // Error! (Calls: int const& IntegerArray::get(int) const)
}

The const-ness of the calling object determines which version of IntegerArray::get() will be invoked and thus whether or not the caller is given a reference with which he can manipulate or only observe the private data in the object. The two methods technically have different signatures because their "this" pointers have different types, allowing the compiler to choose the right one. (Returning a const reference to an int, instead of merely returning the int by value, may be overkill in the second method, but the same technique can be used for arbitrary types, as in the Standard Template Library.)

== Loopholes to const-correctness ==
There are several loopholes to pure const-correctness in C and C++. They exist primarily for compatibility with existing code.

The first, which applies only to C++, is the use of const_cast, which allows the programmer to strip the const qualifier, making any object modifiable. The necessity of stripping the qualifier arises when using existing code and libraries that cannot be modified but which are not const-correct. For instance, consider this code:

// Prototype for a function which we cannot change but which
// we know does not modify the pointee passed in.
void myLibFunc(int* p, int size);

void callLibFunc(const int* p, int size) {
    myLibFunc(p, size); // Error! Drops const qualifier

    int* nonConstPtr = const_cast<int*>(p); // Strip qualifier
    myLibFunc(nonConstPtr, size);  // OK
}

However, any attempt to modify an object that is itself declared const by means of a const cast results in undefined behavior according to the ISO C++ Standard. In the example above, if ptr references a global, local, or member variable declared as const, or an object allocated on the heap via new int const, the code is only correct if LibraryFunc really does not modify the value pointed to by ptr.

The C language has a need of a loophole because a certain situation exists. Variables with static storage duration are allowed to be defined with an initial value. However, the initializer can use only constants like string constants and other literals, and is not allowed to use non-constant elements like variable names, whether the initializer elements are declared const or not, or whether the static duration variable is being declared const or not. There is a non-portable way to initialize a const variable that has static storage duration. By carefully constructing a typecast on the left hand side of a later assignment, a const variable can be written to, effectively stripping away the const attribute and 'initializing' it with non-constant elements like other const variables and such. Writing into a const variable this way may work as intended, but it causes undefined behavior and seriously contradicts const-correctness:

constexpr size_t BUFFER_SIZE = 8 * 1024;
const size_t userTextBufferSize;  // initial value depends on const BUFFER_SIZE, can't be initialized here

...

int setupUserTextBox(TextBox* defaultTextBoxType, Rectangle* defaultTextBoxLocation) {
    *(size_t*)&userTextBufferSize = BUFFER_SIZE - sizeof(TextBoxControls);  // warning: might work, but not guaranteed by C
    ...
}

Another loophole applies both to C and C++. Specifically, the languages dictate that member pointers and references are "shallow" with respect to the const-ness of their owners – that is, a containing object that is const has all const members except that member pointees (and referees) are still mutable. To illustrate, consider this C++ code:

struct MyStruct {
    int val;
    int* ptr;
};

void foo(const MyStruct& s) {
    int i  = 42;
    s.val  = i;  // Error: s is const, so val is a const int
    s.ptr  = &i; // Error: s is const, so ptr is a const pointer to int
    *s.ptr = i;  // OK: the data pointed to by ptr is always mutable, even though this is sometimes not desirable
}

Although the object s passed to foo() is constant, which makes all of its members constant, the pointee accessible through s.ptr is still modifiable, though this may not be desirable from the standpoint of const-correctness because s might solely own the pointee. For this reason, Meyers argues that the default for member pointers and references should be "deep" const-ness, which could be overridden by a mutable qualifier when the pointee is not owned by the container, but this strategy would create compatibility issues with existing code. Thus, for historical reasons, this loophole remains open in C and C++.

The latter loophole can be closed by using a class to hide the pointer behind a const-correct interface, but such classes either do not support the usual copy semantics from a const object (implying that the containing class cannot be copied by the usual semantics either) or allow other loopholes by permitting the stripping of const-ness through inadvertent or intentional copying.

Finally, several functions in the C standard library violate const-correctness before C23, as they accept a const pointer to a character string and return a non-const pointer to a part of the same string. strstr and strchr are among these functions. Some implementations of the C++ standard library, such as Microsoft's try to close this loophole by providing two overloaded versions of some functions: a "const" version and a "non-const" version.

== Problems ==
The use of the type system to express constancy leads to various complexities and problems, and has accordingly been criticized and not adopted outside the narrow C family of C, C++, and D. Java and C#, which are heavily influenced by C and C++, both explicitly rejected const-style type qualifiers, instead expressing constancy by keywords that apply to the identifier (final in Java, const and readonly in C#). Even within C and C++, the use of const varies significantly, with some projects and organizations using it consistently, and others avoiding it.

=== strchr problem ===
The const type qualifier causes difficulties when the logic of a function is agnostic to whether its input is constant or not, but returns a value which should be of the same qualified type as an input. In other words, for these functions, if the input is constant (const-qualified), the return value should be as well, but if the input is variable (not const-qualified), the return value should be as well. Because the type signature of these functions differs, it requires two functions (or potentially more, in case of multiple inputs) with the same logic – a form of generic programming.

This problem arises even for simple functions in the C standard library, notably strchr; this observation is credited by Ritchie to Tom Plum in the mid-1980s. The strchr function locates a character in a string; formally, it returns a pointer to the first occurrence of the character c in the string s, and in classic C (K&R C) its prototype is:

char* strchr(char* s, int c);

The strchr function does not modify the input string, but the return value is often used by the caller to modify the string, such as:

if (p = strchr(q, '/')) {
    *p = ' ';
}

Thus on the one hand the input string can be const (since it is not modified by the function), and if the input string is const the return value should be as well – most simply because it might return exactly the input pointer, if the first character is a match – but on the other hand the return value should not be const if the original string was not const, since the caller may wish to use the pointer to modify the original string.

In C++ this is done via function overloading, typically implemented via a template, resulting in two functions, so that the return value has the same const-qualified type as the input:

char* strchr(char* s, int c);
const char* strchr(const char* s, int c);

These can in turn be defined by a template:

template <T>
T* strchr(T* s, int c) { ... }

In D this is handled via the inout keyword, which acts as a wildcard for const, immutable, or unqualified (variable), yielding: (Note: Idiomatic D code would use an array here instead of a pointer.)

inout(char)* strchr(inout(char)* s, int c);

However, in C neither of these is possible (Note: In C11 and later _Generic could have been used to implement a const-correct strchr. char* strchr_m(char* s, int c); const char* strchr_c(const char* s, int c); #define strchr(X,Y) _Generic((X), \      char*: strchr_m, \      const char*: strchr_c \ )(X,Y)) since C does not have function overloading, and instead, this is handled by having a single function where the input is constant but the output is writable:

char* strchr(const char* s, int c);

This allows idiomatic C code but does strip the const qualifier if the input actually was const-qualified, violating type safety. This solution was proposed by Ritchie and subsequently adopted. This difference is one of the failures of compatibility of C and C++.

Since C23, this problem is solved with the use of the _Generic facility of the language: the identifiers of strchr and the other functions affected by the issue have been turned into macros that expand a call to an appropriate function which will return a const pointer if one was passed to them and an unqualified pointer if an unqualified pointer was passed to them.

== D ==
In version 2 of the D programming language, two keywords relating to const exist. The immutable keyword denotes data that cannot be modified through any reference. The const keyword denotes a non-mutable view of mutable data. Unlike C++ const, D const and immutable are "deep" or transitive, and anything reachable through a const or immutable object is const or immutable respectively.

Example of const vs. immutable in D

int[] foo = new int[5];  // foo is mutable.
const int[] bar = foo;   // bar is a const view of mutable data.
immutable int[] baz = foo;  // Error:  all views of immutable data must be immutable.

immutable int[] nums = new immutable(int)[5];  // No mutable reference to nums may be created.
const int[] constNums = nums;  // Works.  immutable is implicitly convertible to const.
int[] mutableNums = nums;  // Error:  Cannot create a mutable view of immutable data.

Example of transitive or deep const in D

class LinkedList {
    int value;
    LinkedList next;
}

immutable LinkedList ll = new immutable(LinkedList);
ll.next.value = 5; 
// Won't compile. ll.next is of type immutable(LinkedList).
// ll.next.value is of type immutable(int).

== History ==
const was introduced by Bjarne Stroustrup in C with Classes, the predecessor to C++, in 1981, and was originally called readonly. As to motivation, Stroustrup writes:

"It served two functions: as a way of defining a symbolic constant that obeys scope and type rules (that is, without using a macro) and as a way of deeming an object in memory immutable."

The first use, as a scoped and typed alternative to macros, was analogously fulfilled for function-like macros via the inline keyword. Constant pointers, and the * const notation, were suggested by Dennis Ritchie and so adopted.

const was then adopted in C as part of standardization, and appears in C89 (and subsequent versions) along with the other type qualifier, volatile. A further qualifier, noalias, was suggested at the December 1987 meeting of the X3J11 committee, but was rejected; its goal was ultimately fulfilled by the restrict keyword in C99. Ritchie was not very supportive of these additions, arguing that they did not "carry their weight", but ultimately did not argue for their removal from the standard.

D subsequently inherited const from C++, where it is known as a type constructor (not type qualifier) and added two further type constructors, immutable and inout, to handle related use cases. (Note: D also introduced the shared type constructor, but this is related to use cases of volatile, not const.)

== Other languages ==
Other languages do not follow C/C++ in having constancy part of the type, though they often have superficially similar constructs and may use the const keyword. Typically this is only used for constants (constant objects).

C# has a const keyword, but with radically different and simpler semantics: it means a compile-time constant, and is not part of the type. It is essentially equivalent to constexpr in C and C++.

Nim has a const keyword similar to that of C#: it also declares a compile-time constant rather than forming part of the type. However, in Nim, a constant can be declared from any expression that can be evaluated at compile time. In C#, only C# built-in types can be declared as const; user-defined types, including classes, structs, and arrays, cannot be const.

Rust has a const keyword similar to that of C#, which declares compile-time constants, functions, and other symbols. It is thus essentially equivalent to constexpr from C and C++. In contrast to C and C++, Rust's variables and references are unwritable by default and they can be made writable (mutable) with the mut keyword. However, its syntax for unwritable raw pointers (which don't carry Rust's usual safety guarantees) does use the keyword in the same sense as C and C++ do: *const T is an unwritable raw pointer to the type T. A writable raw pointer is denoted as *mut T.

Java does not use const – it instead has final, which can be applied to local "variable" declarations and applies to the identifier, not the type. It has a different object-oriented use for object members, which is the origin of the name. The Java language specification regards const as a reserved keyword – i.e., one that cannot be used as variable identifier – but assigns no semantics to it: it is a reserved word (it cannot be used in identifiers) but not a keyword (it has no special meaning). The keyword was included as a means for Java compilers to detect and warn about the incorrect usage of C++ keywords. An enhancement request ticket for implementing const correctness exists in the Java Community Process, but was closed in 2005 on the basis that it was impossible to implement in a backwards-compatible fashion.

The contemporary Ada 83 independently had the notion of a constant object and a constant keyword, (Note: The Ada standard calls this a "reserved word"; see that article for usage.) with input parameters and loop parameters being implicitly constant. Here the constant is a property of the object, not of the type.

JavaScript has a const declaration that defines a block-scoped variable that cannot be reassigned nor redeclared. It defines a read-only reference to a variable that cannot be redefined, but in some situations the value of the variable itself may potentially change, such as if the variable refers to an object and a property of it is altered.

== See also ==
- constexpr
- Single assignment
- restrict
- Pointer aliasing
