= Virtual heritage =

ICT works regarding cultural heritage

Virtual heritage or cultural heritage and technology is the body of works dealing with information and communication technologies and their application to cultural heritage, such as virtual archaeology. It aims to restore ancient cultures as real (virtual) environments where users can immerse.

Virtual heritage and cultural heritage have independent meanings: cultural heritage refers to sites, monuments, buildings and objects "with historical, aesthetic, archaeological, scientific, ethnological or anthropological value", whereas virtual heritage refers to instances of these within a technological domain, usually involving computer visualization of artefacts or virtual reality environments.

== First use ==
The first use of virtual heritage as a museum exhibit, and the derivation of the name virtual tour, was in 1994 as a museum visitor interpretation, providing a 'walk-through' of a 3D reconstruction of Dudley Castle in England as it was in 1550. This consisted of a computer controlled laserdisc based system designed by British-based engineer Colin Johnson. It is a little-known fact that one of the first users of virtual heritage was Queen Elizabeth II, when she officially opened the visitor centre in June 1994. Because the Queen's officials had requested titles, descriptions and instructions of all activities, the system was named 'Virtual Tour', being a cross between virtual reality and a royal tour.

== Projects ==
One technology that is frequently employed in virtual heritage applications is augmented reality (AR), which is used to provide on-site reconstructions of archaeological sites or artefacts. An example is the lifeClipper project, a Swiss commercial tourism and mixed reality urban heritage project. Using HMD technology, users walking the streets of Basel can see cultured AR video characters and objects as well as oddly-shaped stencils.

Many virtual heritage projects focus on the tangible aspects of cultural heritage, for example 3D modelling, graphics and animation. In doing so, they often overlook the intangible aspects of cultural heritage associated with objects and sites, such as stories, performances and dances. The tangible aspects of cultural heritage are inseparable from the intangible and one method for combining them is the use of virtual heritage serious games, such as the 'Digital Songlines' and 'Virtual Songlines' which modify computer game technology to preserve, protect and present the cultural heritage of Aboriginal Australian Peoples. There have been numerous applications of digital models being used to engage the public and encourage involvement in built heritage activities and discourse.

Place-Hampi is another example of a virtual heritage project. It applies co-evolutionary systems to show a cultural presence using stereoscopic rendering of the landscape of Hampi, a UNESCO World Heritage Site in Karnataka, India.

== See also ==
- CyArk
- Computational archaeology
- Digital heritage
