= Marker interface pattern =

Design pattern in computer science

The marker interface pattern is a design pattern in computer science, used with languages that provide run-time type information about objects. It provides a means to associate metadata with a class where the language does not have explicit support for such metadata.

To use this pattern, a class implements a marker interface (also called tagging interface) which is an empty interface, and methods that interact with instances of that class test for the existence of the interface. Whereas a typical interface specifies functionality (in the form of method declarations) that an implementing class must support, a marker interface need not do so. The mere presence of such an interface indicates specific behavior on the part of the implementing class. Hybrid interfaces, which both act as markers and specify required methods, are possible but may prove confusing if improperly used.

== Example ==
An example of the application of marker interfaces from the Java programming language is the Serializable interface:

package java.io;

public interface Serializable {
}

A class implements this interface to indicate that its non-transient data members can be written to an ObjectOutputStream. The ObjectOutputStream private method writeObject0(Object,boolean) contains a series of instanceof tests to determine writeability, one of which looks for the Serializable interface. If any of these tests fails, the method throws a NotSerializableException.

== Critique ==
One problem with marker interfaces is that, since an interface defines a contract for implementing classes, and that contract is inherited by all subclasses, a marker cannot be "unimplemented". In the example given, any subclass not intended for serialization (perhaps it depends on transient state), must explicitly throw NotSerializableException exceptions (per ObjectOutputStream docs).

Another solution is for the language to support metadata directly:

- Both the .NET Framework and Java (as of Java 5 (1.5)) provide support for such metadata. In .NET, they are called "custom attributes", in Java they are called "annotations". Despite the different name, they are conceptually the same thing. They can be defined on classes, member variables, methods, and method parameters and may be accessed using reflection. C++26 adds similar support for annotations to C++.
- In Python, the term "marker interface" is common in Zope and Plone. Interfaces are declared as metadata and subclasses can use implementsOnly to declare they do not implement everything from their super classes.

== See also ==
- Design markers for an expansion of this pattern.
