= List of Java keywords =

A snippet of Java code with keywords highlighted in blue and bold font

In the Java programming language, a keyword is any one of 68 reserved words that have a predefined meaning in the language. Because of this, programmers cannot use keywords in some contexts, such as names for variables, methods, classes, or as any other identifier. Of these 68 keywords, 17 of them are only contextually reserved, and can sometimes be used as an identifier, unlike standard reserved words. Due to their special functions in the language, most integrated development environments for Java use syntax highlighting to display keywords in a different colour for easy identification.

== Reserved keywords ==
The following words are reserved keywords and cannot be used as identifiers under any circumstances.

_
An underscore is used in place of an identifier of a variable (or pattern) when that variable (or pattern) goes unused.

abstract
A method with no definition must be declared as abstract and the class containing it must be declared as abstract. Abstract classes cannot be instantiated. Abstract methods must be implemented in the subclasses. The abstract keyword cannot be used with variables or constructors. Note that an abstract class is not required to have an abstract method at all.
See abstract type.

assert
Assert describes a predicate (a true–false statement) placed in a Java program to indicate that the developer thinks that the predicate is always true at that place. If an assertion evaluates to false at run-time, an assertion failure results, which typically causes execution to abort. Assertions are disabled at runtime by default, but can be enabled through a command-line option or programmatically through a method on the class loader.
See assertion.

boolean
Defines a boolean variable or return type for the values "true" or "false" only. By default, the value of boolean primitive type is false. In most other languages (such as C/C++, C#, and Rust), the Boolean type is usually simply called bool. As a wrapper class, it becomes java.lang.Boolean.

break
Used to end the execution in the current loop body.
Used to break out of a switch block.
See break statement.

byte
The byte keyword is used to declare a variable or return type that can hold an 8-bit signed two's complement integer. As a wrapper class, it becomes java.lang.Byte.

case
A statement in the switch block can be labeled with one or more case or default labels. The switch statement evaluates its expression, then executes all statements that follow the matching case label; see switch.
See switch statement.

catch
Used in conjunction with a try block and an optional finally block. The statements in the catch block specify what to do if a specific type of exception is thrown by the try block.
See Java exception handling syntax.

char
Defines a character variable or return type capable of holding any character of the Java source file's character set. As a wrapper class, it becomes java.lang.Character.

class
A type that defines the implementation of a particular kind of object. A class definition defines instance and class fields, methods, and inner classes as well as specifying the interfaces the class implements and the immediate superclass of the class. If the superclass is not explicitly specified, the superclass is implicitly java.lang.Object. The class keyword can also be used in the form X.class to get a java.lang.Class<X> object without needing an instance of that class (see java.lang.Class). For example, String.class can be used instead of doing new String().getClass().

continue
Used to resume program execution at the end of the current loop body. If followed by a label, continue resumes execution at the end of the enclosing labeled loop body.
See continue statement.

default
The default keyword can optionally be used in a switch statement to label a block of statements to be executed if no case matches the specified value; see switch. Alternatively, the default keyword can also be used to declare default values in a Java annotation. From Java 8 onwards, the default keyword can be used to allow an interface to provide an implementation of a method.

do
The do keyword is used in conjunction with while to create a do-while loop, which executes a block of statements associated with the loop and then tests a boolean expression associated with the while. If the expression evaluates to true, the block is executed again; this continues until the expression evaluates to false.
See do while loop.

double
The double keyword is used to declare a variable or return type that can hold a 64-bit double precision IEEE 754 floating-point number. As a wrapper class, it becomes java.lang.Double.

else
The else keyword is used in conjunction with if to create an if-else statement, which tests a boolean expression; if the expression evaluates to true, the block of statements associated with the if are evaluated; if it evaluates to false, the block of statements associated with the else are evaluated.

enum
A Java keyword used to declare an enumerated type. Enumerations implicitly inherit from the base class java.lang.Enum.

extends
Used in a class declaration to specify the superclass; used in an interface declaration to specify one or more superinterfaces. Class Y inherits from (extends) class X to add functionality, either by adding fields or methods to class X, or by overriding methods of class X. An interface J inherits from (extends) one or more interfaces I1, I2, ..., by adding methods. Class Y is said to be a subclass of class X; Interface J is said to be a subinterface of the interfaces I1, I2, ... it inherits from.
Also used to specify an upper bound on a type parameter in Generics.
See inheritance.

final
Define an entity once that cannot be changed nor derived from later. More specifically: a final class cannot be subclassed, a final method cannot be overridden, and a final variable can occur at most once as a left-hand expression on an executed command. All methods in a final class are implicitly final.
See final (Java).

finally
Used to define a block of statements for a block defined previously by the try keyword. The finally block is executed after execution exits the try block and any associated catch clauses regardless of whether an exception was thrown or caught, or execution left method in the middle of the try or catch blocks using the return keyword.
See Java exception handling syntax.

float
The float keyword is used to declare a variable or return type that can hold a 32-bit single precision IEEE 754 floating-point number. As a wrapper class, it becomes java.lang.Float.

for
The for keyword is used to create a for loop, which specifies a variable initialization, a boolean expression, and an incrementation. The variable initialization is performed first, and then the boolean expression is evaluated. If the expression evaluates to true, the block of statements associated with the loop are executed, and then the incrementation is performed. The boolean expression is then evaluated again; this continues until the expression evaluates to false.
The for keyword can also be used to create a for-each loop, which specifies an array or java.lang.Iterable object; each iteration of the loop executes the associated block of statements using a different element in the array or java.lang.Iterable<T>.

if
The if keyword is used to create an if statement, which tests a boolean expression; if the expression evaluates to true, the block of statements associated with the if statement is executed. See else.

implements
Included in a class declaration to specify one or more interfaces that are implemented by the current class. A class inherits the types and abstract methods declared by the interfaces.

import
Used at the beginning of a source file to specify classes or entire Java packages to be referred to later without including their package names in the reference. Since J2SE 5.0, import statements can import static members of a class. A Java module may itself be imported (by writing import module), automatically importing all exported packages.

instanceof
A binary operator that takes an object reference as its first operand and a class or interface as its second operand and produces a boolean result. The instanceof operator evaluates to true if and only if the runtime type of the object is assignment compatible with the class or interface.

int
The int keyword is used to declare a variable or return type that can hold a 32-bit signed two's complement integer. As a wrapper class, it becomes java.lang.Integer.

interface
Used to declare an interface that only contains abstract or default methods, constant (static final) fields and static interfaces. It can later be implemented by classes that declare the interface with the implements keyword. As multiple inheritance is not allowed in Java, interfaces are used to circumvent it. An interface can be defined within another interface.

long
The long keyword is used to declare a variable or return type that can hold a 64-bit signed two's complement integer. As a wrapper class, it becomes java.lang.Long.

native
Used in method declarations to specify that the method is not implemented in the same Java source file, but rather in another language (typically C).
See Java Native Interface.

new
Used to create an instance of a class or array object.
See Java object lifetime.

package
A Java package is a group of similar classes and interfaces, declared with the package keyword.
See Java package.

private
The private keyword is used in the declaration of a method, field, or inner class; private members can only be accessed by other members of their own class.
See access modifiers.

protected
The protected keyword is used in the declaration of a method, field, or inner class; protected members can only be accessed by members of their own class, that class's subclasses or classes from the same package.
See access modifiers.

public
The public keyword is used in the declaration of a class, method, or field; public classes, methods, and fields can be accessed by the members of any class.
See access modifiers.

return
Used to finish the execution of a method. It can be followed by a value required by the method definition that is returned to the caller.
See return statement.

short
The short keyword is used to declare a variable or return type that can hold a 16-bit signed two's complement integer. As a wrapper class, it becomes java.lang.Short.

static
Used to declare a field, method, or inner class as a class field. Classes maintain one copy of class fields regardless of how many instances exist of that class. static also is used to define a method as a class method. Class methods are bound to the class instead of to a specific instance, and can only operate on class fields. Classes and interfaces declared as static members of another class or interface are behaviorally top-level classes.
See static variable.

super
Inheritance basically used to achieve dynamic binding or run-time polymorphism in Java. Used to access members of a class inherited by the class in which it appears. Allows a subclass to access overridden methods and hidden members of its superclass. The super keyword is also used to forward a call from a constructor to a constructor in the superclass.
Also used to specify a lower bound on a type parameter in Generics.
See inheritance.

switch
The switch keyword is used in conjunction with case and default to create a switch statement, which evaluates a variable, matches its value to a specific case (including patterns), and executes the block of statements associated with that case. If no case matches the value, the optional block labelled by default is executed, if included. The switch keyword can also be used with the non-reserved keyword yield to create switch expressions.

synchronized
Used in the declaration of a method or code block to acquire the mutex lock for an object while the current thread executes the code. For static methods, the object locked is the class's java.lang.Class. Guarantees that at most one thread at a time operating on the same object executes that code. The mutex lock is automatically released when execution exits the synchronized code. Fields, classes and interfaces cannot be declared as synchronized.

this
Used to represent an instance of the class in which it appears. this can be used to access class members and as a reference to the current instance. The this keyword is also used to forward a call from one constructor in a class to another constructor in the same class.

throw
Causes the declared exception instance to be thrown. This causes execution to continue with the first enclosing exception handler declared by the catch keyword to handle an assignment compatible exception type. If no such exception handler is found in the current method, then the method returns and the process is repeated in the calling method. If no exception handler is found in any method call on the stack, then the exception is passed to the thread's uncaught exception handler.
See Java exception handling syntax.

throws
Used in method declarations to specify which exceptions are not handled within the method but rather passed to the next higher level of the program. All uncaught checked exceptions in a method (extend java.lang.Throwable but not java.lang.Error or java.lang.RuntimeException) must be declared using the throws keyword.
See checked exceptions.

transient
Declares that an instance field is not part of the default serialized form of an object. When an object is serialized, only the values of its non-transient instance fields are included in the default serial representation. When an object is deserialized, transient fields are initialized only to their default value. If the default form is not used, e.g. when a serialPersistentFields table is declared in the class hierarchy, all transient keywords are ignored. The transient specifier only applies if the type implements java.io.Serializable, but not if it implements java.io.Externalizable (a sub-interface of java.io.Serializable).
See transient.

try
Defines a block of statements that have exception handling. If an exception is thrown inside the try block, an optional catch block can handle declared exception types. An optional finally block can be declared that will be executed when execution exits the try block and catch clauses, regardless of whether an exception is thrown or not. A try block must have at least one catch clause or a finally block.
See Java exception handling syntax.

void
The void keyword is used to declare that a method does not return any value. As a wrapper class, it becomes java.lang.Void.
See void type.

volatile
Used in field declarations to guarantee visibility of changes to variables across threads. Every read of a volatile variable will be read from main memory, and not from the CPU cache, and that every write to a volatile variable will be written to main memory, and not just to the CPU cache. Methods, classes and interfaces thus cannot be declared volatile, nor can local variables or parameters. Note that in C and C++, volatile is not used for thread safety, but rather indicates that the value of the variable may change outside of the program's control, and cannot be optimised.
See volatile variable.

while
The while keyword is used to create a while loop, which tests a boolean expression and executes the block of statements associated with the loop if the expression evaluates to true; this continues until the expression evaluates to false. This keyword can also be used to create a do-while loop; see do.

=== Unused ===
The following words are reserved as keywords, but currently have no use or purpose.

const
Although reserved as a keyword in Java, const is not used and has no function. In other languages, const is typically used to define constants. For defining constants in Java, see the final keyword.
See constant and constexpr.

goto
Although reserved as a keyword in Java, goto is not used and has no function. In other languages, goto is typically used as a one-way control statement to jump to a label at another line of code.

strictfp
Although reserved as a keyword in Java, strictfp is obsolete, and no longer has any function. Previously, this keyword was used to restrict the precision and rounding of floating point calculations to ensure portability; since Java 17 all floating-point evaluation runs with strict semantics.

== Contextual keywords ==
The following identifiers are contextual keywords, and are only restricted in some contexts:

exports
Used in a module declaration to specify which packages are available to other modules.

module
Declares a module (a collection of related packages and resources that can be treated as a unit), used to encapsulate and expose only the public API of a library.
See Java Platform Module System.

non-sealed
Used to declare that a class or interface which extends a sealed class can be extended by unknown classes.
See sealed class.

open
Indicates that all classes in a package are accessible via reflection by other modules.

opens
Used to open a specific package for reflection to other modules.

permits
The permits clause specifies the classes that are permitted to extend a sealed class.
See sealed class.

provides
Used to declare that a module provides an implementation of a service interface.

record
A special kind of class that acts as a transparent carrier of immutable data, automatically providing equals(), hashCode(), and toString() methods. Records all implicitly inherit from java.lang.Record.
See record (computer science).

requires
Used in a module declaration to specify that the module depends on another module.

sealed
A sealed class or interface can only be extended or implemented by classes and interfaces permitted to do so.
See sealed class.

to
Used with the opens directive to specify which module is allowed to reflectively access the package.

transitive
Used with the requires directive to indicate that a module not only requires another module but also makes that module's dependencies available to modules that depend on it.

uses
Used in a module to declare that the module is using a service (i.e. it will consume a service provided by other modules).

var
A special identifier that cannot be used as a type name (since Java 10). Used to declare a variable without explicitly specifying the type, rather relying on the compiler to infer the type based on the initialiser.
See type inference.

when
Used as an additional check for a case statement.

with
Used with the provides directive to specify which implementation of a service is provided by the module.

yield
Used to set a value for a switch expression, when using labelled statement groups (for example, case L:).

== Reserved words for literal values ==
The following words refer to literal values used by the language.

true
A boolean literal value of truth.

false
A boolean literal value of falsehood.

null
A reference literal value of null.

== See also ==
- Java syntax
- Java annotation
