= Strictfp =

Obsolete Java keyword for restricted floating-point calculations

strictfp is an obsolete and redundant reserved word in the Java programming language. Previously, this keyword was used as a modifier that restricted floating-point calculations to IEEE 754 semantics to ensure portability. The strictfp keyword was introduced into Java with the Java virtual machine (JVM) version 1.2 and its functionality was removed in JVM version 17. As of Java 17, IEEE 754 semantics is required, thus using this keyword has no effect.

== Basis ==
The IEEE standard IEEE 754 specifies a standard method for both floating-point calculations and storage of floating-point values in various formats, including single (32-bit, used in Java's float) or double (64-bit, used in Java's double) precision.

Some hardware also provides extended precision formats that provide higher precision and/or a larger exponent range. On such architectures, it may be more efficient to compute intermediate results using such extended formats. This may avoid round-off errors, overflows and underflows that would otherwise occur, but can cause programs to produce different output on such architectures. It was particularly expensive to avoid the use of extended precision on x86 machines with the traditional x87 floating-point architecture. Although it was easy to control calculation precision, limiting the exponent range for intermediate results required additional costly instructions.

Before JVM 1.2, floating-point calculations were required to be strict; that is, all intermediate floating-point results were required to behave as if represented using IEEE single or double precisions. This made it expensive on common x87-based hardware to ensure that overflows would occur where required.

Starting with JVM 1.2, intermediate computations were, by default, allowed to exceed the standard exponent ranges associated with IEEE 32-bit and 64 bit formats. They were permitted to instead be represented as a member of the "extended-exponent" value set. On platforms like x87, overflows and underflows might not occur where expected, producing possibly more meaningful, but less repeatable, results instead.

Since x87 floating point is no longer necessary on x86 processors supporting SSE2, Java 17 again made all floating-point operations strict, effectively restoring the pre-1.2 semantics.

== How it works ==
In the absence of overflow or underflow, there is no difference in results with or without strictfp. If repeatability is essential, the strictfp modifier can be used to ensure that overflow and underflow occur in the same places on all platforms. Without the strictfp modifier, intermediate results may use a larger exponent range.

The strictfp modifier accomplishes this by representing all intermediate values as IEEE single precision and double precision values, as occurred in earlier versions of the JVM.

== Usage ==
Programmers can use the modifier strictfp to ensure that calculations are performed as in the earlier versions; that is, only with IEEE single and double precision types used. Using strictfp guarantees that the results of floating-point calculations are identical on all platforms.

It can be used on classes, interfaces, and non-abstract methods. When applied to a method, it causes all calculations inside the method to use strict floating-point math. When applied to a class, all calculations inside the class use strict floating-point math. Compile-time constant expressions must always use strict floating-point behavior.

Examples

public strictfp class MyFPclass { 
    // ... contents of class here ...
}
