= Translation unit =

In the field of translation, a translation unit is a segment of a text which the translator treats as a single cognitive unit for the purposes of establishing an equivalence. It may be a single word, a phrase, one or more sentences, or even a larger unit.

When a translator segments a text into translation units, the larger these units are, the better chance there is of obtaining an idiomatic translation. This is true not only of human translation, but also where human translators use computer-assisted translation, such as translation memories, and when translations are performed by machine translation systems.

== Perceptions on the concept of unit ==
Vinay and Darbelnet took to Saussure's original concepts of the linguistic sign when beginning to discuss the idea of a single word as a translation unit. According to Saussure, the sign is naturally arbitrary, so it can only derive meaning from contrast in other signs in that same system.

However, Russian scholar Leonid Barkhudarov stated that, limiting it to poetry, for instance, a translation unit can take the form of a complete text. This seems to relate to his conception that a translation unit is the smallest unit in the source language with an equivalent in the target one, and when its parts are taken individually, they become untranslatable; these parts can be as small as phonemes or morphemes, or as large as entire texts.

Susan Bassnett widened Barkhudarov's poetry perception to include prose, adding that in this type of translation text is the prime unit, including the idea that sentence-by-sentence translation could cause loss of important structural features.

Swiss linguist Werner Koller connected Barkhudarov's idea of unit sizing to the difference between the two languages involved, by stating that the more different or unrelated these languages were, the larger the unit would be.

One final perception on the idea of unit came from linguist Eugene Nida. To him, translation units have a tendency to be small groups of language building up into sentences, thus forming what he called meaningful mouthfuls of language.

== Points of view towards translation units ==
=== Process-oriented POV ===
According to this point of view, a translation unit is a stretch of text on which attention is focused to be represented as a whole in the target language. In this point of view we can consider the concept of the think-aloud protocol, supported by German linguist Wolfgang Lörscher: isolating units using self-reports by translating subjects. It also relates to how experienced the translator in question is: language learners take a word as a translation unit, whereas experienced translators isolate and translate units of meaning in the form of phrases, clauses or sentences.

Since 1996 and 2005 keylogging and eyetracking technologies were introduced in Translation Process Research. These more advanced and non-invasive research methods made it possible to elaborate a finer-grained assessment of translation units as loops of (source or target text) reading and target text typing. Loops of translation units are thought to be the basic units by which translations are produced. Thus, Malmkjaer, for instance, defines process oriented translation units as a “stretch of the source text that the translator keeps in mind at any one time, in order to produce translation equivalents in the text he or she is creating” (p. 286). Records of keystrokes and eye movements allow to investigate these mental constructs through their physical (observable) behavioral traces in the translation process data. Empirical Translation Process Research has deployed numerous theories to explain and models the behavioral traces of these assumed mental units.

=== Product-oriented POV ===
Here, the target-text unit can be mapped into an equivalent source-text unit. A case study on this matter was reported by Gideon Toury, in which 27 English-Hebrew student-produced translations were mapped onto a source text. Those students that were less experienced had larger numbers of small units at word and morpheme level in their translations, while one student with translation experience had approximately half of those units, mostly at phrase or clause level.
