= LifeClipper =

lifeClipper is an augmented reality outdoor art project created by the Basel-based artist Jan Torpus in 2004, utilising an immersive wearable head-mounted display (HMD) system built from off-the-shelf components. It was presented by the new media art organization plug.in in the historic St. Alban quarter in Basel, Switzerland. The individual parts are: Portable computer, head mounted display, video camera, microphone, GPS sensor, compass and pressure sensors. When moving around, the system uses GPS co-ordinates to trigger images and sounds for the user, so that they may look at an area of interest and have impressions of the past for example brought up in their display. Many users have described the experience like living in a movie.

The project evolved into lifeClipper2 (Basel, 2006–2008), an interdisciplinary design research project chaired by the Institute for Research in Art and Design of the University of Applied Sciences Northwestern Switzerland. It explored the potential of augmented reality for project visualization, urban planning and tourism.

lifeClipper3 (Basel, 2009–2011) is based on technology and findings of the precedent lifeClipper projects and includes a breath biofeedback sensors for interaction. The last one of the lifeClipper series is a game-like piece of new media art which is implemented in St. Johanns Park in Basel, Switzerland. It invites visitors to walk around the park to experience alternative realities. Shifts between everyday life conventions and a fantastic parallel universe with different physical and cultural rules create interference and question the visitor's perception of reality.
