= Unordered map =

Unordered map can refer to:

- Unordered associative containers (C++)
- Hash table
- Associative array
