= Unordered associative containers (C++) =

Unordered associative data types in the C++ standard library

In C++, unordered associative containers or unordered associative collections are a group of class templates in the C++ Standard Library that implement hash table variants. Being templates, they can be used to store arbitrary elements, such as integers or custom classes. Like all other standard library components, they reside in namespace std.

The following containers are defined in the current revision of the C++ standard:

- std::unordered_set<T>
- std::unordered_map<K, V>
- std::unordered_multiset<T>
- std::unordered_multimap<K, V>.

Each of these containers differ only on constraints placed on their elements.

std::unordered_set and std::unordered_multiset are declared in header <unordered_set>, while std::unordered_map and std::unordered_multimap are declared in header <unordered_map>.

There are also versions of these collections in namespace std::pmr (for polymorphic memory resources). These versions specify the optional template parameter Alloc as std::pmr::polymorphic_allocator.

The unordered associative containers are similar to the associative containers in the C++ Standard Library but have different constraints. As their name implies, the elements in the unordered associative containers are not ordered. This is due to the use of hashing to store objects. The containers can still be iterated through like a regular associative container.

std::unordered_map and std::unordered_set are essentially (respectively) equivalent to java.util.HashMap and java.util.HashSet from Java, System.Collections.Generic.Dictionary and System.Collections.Generic.HashSet from .NET, or std::collections::HashMap and std::collections::HashSet from Rust.

== History ==
The first widely used implementation of hash tables in the C++ language was hash_map, hash_set, hash_multimap, hash_multiset class templates of the Silicon Graphics (SGI) Standard Template Library (STL). Due to their usefulness, they were later included in several other implementations of the C++ Standard Library (e.g., the GNU Compiler Collection's (GCC) libstdc++ and the Visual C++ (MSVC) standard library).

The hash_* class templates were proposed into C++ Technical Report 1 (C++ TR1) and were accepted under names unordered_*. Later, they were incorporated into the C++11 revision of the C++ standard. An implementation is also available in the Boost C++ Libraries as <boost/unordered_map.hpp>.

== Overview of functions ==
The containers are defined in headers named after the names of the containers, e.g., unordered_set is defined in header <unordered_set>. All containers satisfy the requirements of the Container concept, which means they have begin(), end(), size(), max_size(), empty(), and swap() methods.

	unordered_set (C++11)	unordered_map (C++11)	unordered_multiset (C++11)	unordered_multimap (C++11)	Description
	(constructor)	(constructor)	(constructor)	(constructor)	Constructs the container from variety of sources
	(destructor)	(destructor)	(destructor)	(destructor)	Destructs the set and the contained elements
	operator=	operator=	operator=	operator=	Assigns values to the container
	get_allocator	get_allocator	get_allocator	get_allocator	Returns the allocator used to allocate memory for the elements
Element access	—N/a	at	—N/a	—N/a	Accesses specified element with bounds checking.
Element access	—N/a	operator[]	—N/a	—N/a	Accesses specified element without bounds checking.
Iterators	begin	begin	begin	begin	Returns an iterator to the beginning of the container
Iterators	end	end	end	end	Returns an iterator to the end of the container
Capacity	empty	empty	empty	empty	Checks whether the container is empty
Capacity	size	size	size	size	Returns number of elements in the container.
Capacity	max_size	max_size	max_size	max_size	Returns the maximum possible number of elements in the container
Modifiers	clear	clear	clear	clear	Clears the contents.
Modifiers	insert	insert	insert	insert	Inserts elements.
Modifiers	emplace	emplace	emplace	emplace	Constructs elements in-place (C++11)
Modifiers	emplace_hint	emplace_hint	emplace_hint	emplace_hint	Constructs elements in-place using a hint (C++11)
Modifiers	erase	erase	erase	erase	Erases elements.
Modifiers	swap	swap	swap	swap	Swaps the contents with another container.
Lookup	count	count	count	count	Returns the number of elements matching specific key.
Lookup	find	find	find	find	Finds an element with specific key.
Lookup	equal_range	equal_range	equal_range	equal_range	Returns a range of elements matching specific key.
Bucket interface	...				
Hash policy	...				
Observers	hash_function	hash_function	hash_function	hash_function	Returns the function used to create hash of a key
Observers	key_eq	key_eq	key_eq	key_eq	Returns key comparison function.

== Usage example ==
import std;

using std::string;
using std::unordered_map;

const unordered_map<string, int> MONTHS {
    {"January", 31},
    {"February", 28},
    {"March", 31},
    {"April", 30},
    {"May", 31},
    {"June", 30},
    {"July", 31},
    {"August", 31},
    {"September", 30},
    {"October", 31},
    {"November", 30},
    {"December", 31}
};
 
int main(int argc, char* argv[]) {
    std::println("September -> {}", MONTHS["September"]);
    std::println("April -> {}", MONTHS["April"]);
    std::println("December -> {}", MONTHS["December"]);
    std::println("February -> {}", MONTHS["February"]);
    return 0;
}

== Custom hash functions ==
To use custom objects in std::unordered_map, a custom hasher must be defined. This function takes a const reference to the custom type and returns a size_t.

import std;

using std::hash;
 
struct Vector3 {
    int i;
    int j;
    int k;
};

struct HashVector3 {
    size_t operator()(const Vector3& x) const {
        return hash<int>()(x.i) ^ hash<int>()(x.j) ^ hash<int>()(x.k);
    }
};

The user defined function can be used as is in std::unordered_map, by passing it as a template parameter

unordered_map<Vector3, int, HashVector3> myPointToIntMap;

Or can be set as the default hash function by specializing std::hash:

namespace std {
    template <>
    class hash<Vector3> {
    public:
        size_t operator()(const Vector3& x) const {
            return hash<int>()(x.i) ^ hash<int>()(x.j) ^ hash<int>()(x.k);
        }
    };
}

//...
unordered_map<Vector3, int> myPointToIntMap;

== See also ==
- Sequence container (C++)
- Associative containers (C++)
