= C POSIX library =

C language standard library specifically for POSIX systems

The C POSIX library is a specification of a C standard library for POSIX systems. It was developed at the same time as the ANSI C standard. Some effort was made to make POSIX compatible with standard C; POSIX includes additional functions to those introduced in standard C. On the other hand, the 5 headers that were added to the C standard library with C11, were not likewise included in subsequent revisions of POSIX.

It may be included in any C++ project, however the C++ standard library may have its own implementation of certain features, such as <regex> rather than <regex.h>, <thread> rather than <pthread.h>, or <semaphore> rather than <semaphore.h>.

== C POSIX library header files ==
Header file	Description	First released	C Standard
<aio.h>	Asynchronous input and output	Issue 5	
<arpa/inet.h>	Functions for manipulating numeric IP addresses (part of Berkeley sockets)	Issue 6	
<assert.h>	Verify assumptions	Issue 1	ANSI (89)
<complex.h>	Complex Arithmetic, see C mathematical functions	Issue 6	C99
<cpio.h>	Magic numbers for the cpio archive format	Issue 3	
<ctype.h>	Character types	Issue 1	ANSI (89)
<devctl.h>	Device control	Issue 8	
<dirent.h>	Allows the opening and listing of directories	Issue 2	
<dlfcn.h>	Dynamic linking	Issue 5	
<errno.h>	Retrieving Error Number	Issue 1	ANSI (89)
<endian.h>	Endianness operations	Issue 8	
<fcntl.h>	File opening, locking and other operations	Issue 1	
<fenv.h>	Floating-Point Environment (FPE), see C mathematical functions	Issue 6	C99
<float.h>	Floating-point types, see C data types	Issue 4	ANSI (89)
<fmtmsg.h>	Message display structures	Issue 4	
<fnmatch.h>	Filename matching	Issue 4	
<ftw.h>	File tree traversal	Issue 1	
<glob.h>	Pathname "globbing" (pattern-matching)	Issue 4	
<grp.h>	User group information and control	Issue 1	
<iconv.h>	Codeset conversion facility	Issue 4	
<inttypes.h>	Fixed sized integer types, see C data types	Issue 5	C99
<iso646.h>	Alternative spellings, see C alternative tokens	Issue 5	NA1 (95)
<langinfo.h>	Language information constants – builds on C localization functions	Issue 2	
<libgen.h>	Pathname manipulation	Issue 4	
<libintl.h>	Internationalization	Issue 8	
<limits.h>	Implementation-defined constants, see C data types	Issue 1	ANSI (89)
<locale.h>	Category macros, see C localization functions	Issue 3	ANSI (89)
<math.h>	Mathematical declarations, see C mathematical functions	Issue 1	ANSI (89)
<monetary.h>	String formatting of monetary units	Issue 4	
<mqueue.h>	Message queue	Issue 5	
<ndbm.h>	NDBM database operations	Issue 4	
<net/if.h>	Listing of local network interfaces	Issue 6	
<netdb.h>	Translating protocol and host names into numeric addresses (part of Berkeley sockets)	Issue 6	
<netinet/in.h>	Defines Internet protocol and address family (part of Berkeley sockets)	Issue 6	
<netinet/tcp.h>	Additional TCP control options (part of Berkeley sockets)	Issue 6	
<nl_types.h>	Localization message catalog functions	Issue 2	
<poll.h>	Asynchronous file descriptor multiplexing	Issue 4	
<pthread.h>	Defines an API for creating and manipulating POSIX threads	Issue 5	
<pwd.h>	passwd (user information) access and control	Issue 1	
<regex.h>	Regular expression matching	Issue 4	
<sched.h>	Execution scheduling	Issue 5	
<search.h>	Search tables	Issue 1	
<semaphore.h>	POSIX semaphores	Issue 5	
<setjmp.h>	Stack environment declarations	Issue 1	ANSI (89)
<signal.h>	Signals, see C signal handling	Issue 1	ANSI (89)
<spawn.h>	Process spawning	Issue 6	
<stdalign.h>	Alignment macros	Issue 8	C11
<stdarg.h>	Handle Variable Argument List	Issue 4	ANSI (89)
<stdatomic.h>	Atomic operations	Issue 8	C11
<stdbool.h>	Boolean type and values, see C data types	Issue 6	C99
<stddef.h>	Standard type definitions, see C data types	Issue 4	ANSI (89)
<stdint.h>	Integer types, see C data types	Issue 6	C99
<stdio.h>	Standard buffered input/output, see C file input/output	Issue 1	ANSI (89)
<stdlib.h>	Standard library definitions, see C standard library	Issue 3	ANSI (89)
<stdnoreturn.h>	The noreturn macro	Issue 8	C11
<string.h>	Several String Operations, see C string handling	Issue 1	ANSI (89)
<strings.h>	Case-insensitive string comparisons	Issue 4	
<stropts.h>	Stream manipulation, including ioctl	Issue 4	
<sys/ipc.h>	Inter-process communication (IPC)	Issue 2	
<sys/mman.h>	Memory management, including POSIX shared memory and memory mapped files	Issue 4	
<sys/msg.h>	POSIX message queues	Issue 2	
<sys/resource.h>	Resource usage, priorities, and limiting	Issue 4	
<sys/select.h>	Synchronous I/O multiplexing	Issue 6	
<sys/sem.h>	XSI (SysV style) semaphores	Issue 2	
<sys/shm.h>	XSI (SysV style) shared memory	Issue 2	
<sys/socket.h>	Main Berkeley sockets header	Issue 6	
<sys/stat.h>	File information (stat et al.)	Issue 1	
<sys/statvfs.h>	File System information	Issue 4	
<sys/time.h>	Time and date functions and structures	Issue 4	
<sys/times.h>	File access and modification times	Issue 1	
<sys/types.h>	Various data types used elsewhere	Issue 1	
<sys/uio.h>	Vectored I/O operations	Issue 4	
<sys/un.h>	Unix domain sockets	Issue 6	
<sys/utsname.h>	Operating system information, including uname	Issue 1	
<sys/wait.h>	Status of terminated child processes (see wait)	Issue 3	
<syslog.h>	System error logging	Issue 4	
<tar.h>	Magic numbers for the tar archive format	Issue 3	
<termios.h>	Allows terminal I/O interfaces	Issue 3	
<tgmath.h>	Type-Generic Macros, see C mathematical functions	Issue 6	C99
<threads.h>	ISO C threads	Issue 8	C11
<time.h>	Type-Generic Macros, see C date and time functions	Issue 1	ANSI (89)
<trace.h>	Tracing of runtime behavior (DEPRECATED)	Issue 6	
<ucontext.h>	manipulate user context (REMOVED in POSIX.1-2008)		
<ulimit.h>	Resource limiting (DEPRECATED in favor of <sys/resource.h>)	Issue 1	
<unistd.h>	Various essential POSIX functions and constants	Issue 1	
<utime.h>	inode access and modification times	Issue 3	
<utmpx.h>	User accounting database functions	Issue 4	
<wchar.h>	Wide-Character Handling, see C string handling	Issue 4	NA1 (95)
<wctype.h>	Wide-Character Classification and Mapping Utilities, see C character classification	Issue 5	NA1 (95)
<wordexp.h>	Word-expansion like the shell would perform	Issue 4	

== See also ==
- POSIX
- C standard library
- C++ standard library
- Windows API
- Windows.h
