= C++ Standard Library =

Collection of classes and functions used in the C++ programming language

In the C++ programming language, the C++ Standard Library is a collection of classes and functions, which are written in the core language and part of the C++ ISO Standard itself.

== Overview ==
The C++ Standard Library provides several generic containers, functions to use and manipulate these containers, function objects, generic strings and streams (including interactive and file I/O), support for some language features, and functions for common tasks such as finding the square root of a number. The C++ Standard Library also incorporates most headers of the ISO C standard library ending with ".h", but their use was deprecated (reverted the deprecation since C++23). C++23 instead considers these headers as useful for interoperability with C, and recommends against their usage outside of programs that are intended to be both valid C and C++ programs. No other headers in the C++ Standard Library end in ".h". Features of the C++ Standard Library are declared within the std namespace.

The C++ Standard Library is based upon conventions introduced by the Standard Template Library (STL), and has been influenced by research in generic programming and developers of the STL such as Alexander Stepanov and Meng Lee. Although the C++ Standard Library and the STL share many features, neither is a strict superset of the other. The naming conventions of the standard library use snake_case, with the exception of std::ios_base::Init, std::text_encoding::id enumerators, and month/weekday constants (i.e. std::chrono::January, std::chrono::Sunday). The design of the C++ standard library, much like the C standard library, is minimalistic, and contains only core features for programming, lacking most of the more specialised features offered by the Java standard library or C# standard library. For more features, some third-party libraries such as Boost libraries and POCO C++ Libraries, which offer additional features, may be used to supplement the standard library. An implementation for a C++ standard library header is described as "freestanding" if the execution of the program does not rely on an operating system.

A noteworthy feature of the C++ Standard Library is that it not only specifies the syntax and semantics of generic algorithms, but also places requirements on their performance. These performance requirements often correspond to a well-known algorithm, which is expected but not required to be used. In most cases this requires linear time $O(n)$ or linearithmic time $O(n \log(n))$, but in some cases higher bounds are allowed, such as quasilinear time $O(n \log^2 (n))$ for stable sort (to allow in-place merge sort). Previously, sorting was only required to take $O(n \log(n))$ on average, allowing the use of quicksort, which is fast in practice but has poor worst-case performance, but introsort was introduced to allow both fast average performance and optimal worst-case complexity, and as of C++11, sorting is guaranteed to be at worst linearithmic. In other cases requirements remain laxer, such as selection, which is only required to be linear on average (as in quickselect), not requiring worst-case linear as in introselect.

The C++ Standard Library underwent ISO standardization as part of the C++ ISO Standardization effort in the 1990s. Since 2011, it has been expanded and updated every three years with each revision of the C++ standard.

C++20 specifies the introduction of standard library header units, and C++23 adds full module support for the standard library.

== Implementations ==
Name	Organization	Homepage	Acronym	Licence	Latest release
GNU C++ Standard Library	GNU Project and Free Software Foundation		libstdc++	GPLv3 with GCC Runtime Library Exception	New major release once per year
LLVM C++ Standard Library	LLVM Developer Group		libc++	Apache License 2.0 with LLVM Exceptions	Every 2 weeks
NVIDIA C++ Standard Library	Nvidia		libcudacxx	Apache License 2.0 with LLVM Exceptions	September 4, 2024; 2 years ago
Microsoft C++ Standard Library	Microsoft		MSVC STL	Apache License 2.0 with LLVM Exceptions	Daily
HPX C++ Standard Library for Parallelism and Concurrency	STELLAR Group	[5]	HPX	Boost Software License 1.0	June 29, 2025; 16 months ago
Electronic Arts Standard Template Library	Electronic Arts		EASTL	BSD 3-Clause License	October 2, 2025; 13 months ago
Dinkum C++ Library	Dinkumware		Unknown	Commercial	Unknown
Cray C++ Standard Library	Cray User Group		Unknown	Commercial	Unknown

=== Discontinued ===
==== Apache C++ Standard Library ====
The Apache C++ Standard Library is another open-source implementation. It was originally developed commercially by Rogue Wave Software and later donated to the Apache Software Foundation. However, after more than five years without a release, the board of the Apache Software Foundation decided to end this project and move it to Apache Attic.

=== See also ===
The following libraries implement much of the C++ Standard Library:

Name	Homepage	Description
Abseil		An open source collection of libraries used internally by Google
Folly		A variety of C++17 libraries that are used extensively by Facebook
Bareflank Support Library		A C++ library where everything can be executed at compile time

== Namespace organisation ==
The C++ standard library is placed inside the std namespace. std was historically a flat namespace (unlike other languages like Java and C#, which extensively divide their respective standard libraries along nomenclatural, hierarchical lines), but since C++11 it has been further divided into sub-namespaces within it:

- std (the main namespace of the standard library)
  - std::chrono (contains facilities for the date and time library)
  - std::contracts (contains facilities for reporting information on contract violations)
    - std::contracts::control (contains only the object enforced, of unspecified type, which must be passed as pre<enforced>/post<enforced>/contract_assert<enforced> to enforce the contract to run)
  - std::execution (contains the execution control library for asynchronous execution, including task<T>)
    - std::execution::parallel_scheduler_replacement (allows for replacement of the default implement of the parallel scheduler)
  - std::filesystem (contains facilities for working with file system manipulation, including directory_entry, path, etc.)
  - std::linalg (contains facilities for linear algebra)
  - std::literals (inlined namespace containing various operators for creating literals of an object)
    - std::literals::chrono_literals (inlined namespace containing various operators for creating literals of duration objects)
    - std::literals::complex_literals (inlined namespace containing various operators for creating literals of imaginary numbers)
    - std::literals::string_literals (inlined namespace containing various operators for creating literals of string objects)
    - std::literals::string_view_literals (inlined namespace containing various operators for creating literals of string-view objects)
  - std::meta (contains facilities for static (compile-time) reflection with the info type representing reflection metadata)
  - std::numbers (contains all numeric constants, such as pi, e, etc.)
  - std::placeholders (contains all placeholder objects _1, _2, ..., up to an implementation-defined maximum _N)
  - std::pmr (contains symbols for polymorphic memory resources, for flexible runtime-configured allocation, as well as versions of the standard library types using polymorphic_allocator as the allocator)
  - std::ranges (contains symbols for working over ranges, which extend the algorithm/iterator libraries)
    - std::ranges::views (contains symbols for range adapters for creating views, for lazy collection manipulation without copies; also aliased as std::views)
  - std::regex_constants (contains various regular expression customisation constants, such as ECMAScript, awk, grep, etc.)
  - std::rel_ops (contains automatically generated comparison operators, deprecated since C++20)
  - std::this_thread (contains facilities for manipulating the current thread)

There is also a std::experimental namespace, with further sub-namespaces in std::experimental::* for various pre-standardised/technical specification features which may be implemented by some compiler vendors.

The posix namespace is reserved by the standard for ISO/IEC 9945 and POSIX-related symbols, but it currently remains unused. Identifiers beginning with two underscores, or with one underscore immediately followed by a capital letter, are reserved by the standard. Additionally, the std and posix namespaces are reserved, and adding declarations/definitions into any of those namespaces (or nested namespaces within) constitute undefined behavior, with a few exceptions (such as std::hash<> and std::formatter<>).

== Standard modules ==
Although modules were first introduced in C++20, standard library modules were only standardised as part of the language in C++23. Prior to that, standard library header units were specified for C++20, but most compiler vendors support backporting standard library modules to C++20. These named modules were added to include all items declared in both global and std namespaces provided by the importable standard headers. Macros are not allowed to be exportable, so users have to manually include or import headers that emit macros for use, or can be alternatively exported as compile-time constants.

The C++ standard has reserved std and std.* as module names, however most compilers allow a flag to override this.

The standard library modules are:

Name	Since	Description
std	C++23 (Note: Informally available in most C++20 implementations.)	Exports all declarations in namespace std and global storage allocation and deallocation functions that are provided by the importable C++ library headers including C library facilities (although declared in standard namespace).
std.compat	C++23	Exports the same declarations as the named module std, and additionally exports functions in global namespace in C library facilities. It thus contains "compat" in the name, meaning compatibility with C.

std.compat is not a submodule of std, but is named so to indicate the association the module bears to the std module (as a "compatibility" version of it). Despite there being only one module for the entire standard library, it has been proposed that additional modules providing other subsets of the standard library be added.

== Standard headers ==
The following files contain the declarations of the C++ Standard Library.

Legend:
: Deprecated
: Removed

=== General ===
Components that C++ programs may use for increased features.

Name	Since	Description
<any>	C++17	Provides a type-erased class any.
<cerrno>	C++98	Related to <errno.h>. For testing error codes reported by library functions.
<chrono>	C++11	Provides time elements, such as duration, time_point, and clocks. Since C++20, additional temporal features were added, including calendars, time zones, more clocks, and time formatting.
<concepts>	C++20	Provides fundamental library concepts.
<contracts>	C++26	Provides design by contract features.
<csetjmp>	C++98	Related to <setjmp.h>. Declares the macros setjmp and longjmp, which are used for non-local exits.
<csignal>	C++98	Related to <signal.h>. Defines signal-handling functions.
<cstdalign>	C++98	Related to <stdalign.h>. For querying and specifying the alignment of objects. Deprecated in C++17, removed in C++20.
<cstdbool>	C++98	Related to <stdbool.h>. Defines a Boolean data type. Deprecated in C++17, removed in C++20.
<cstddef>	C++98	Related to <stddef.h>. Defines several useful types and macros.
<cstdint>	C++98	Related to <stdint.h>. Defines exact-width integer types.
<ctime>	C++98	Related to <time.h>. Defines date- and time-handling functions.
<debugging>	C++26	Provides fundamental library concepts.
<expected>	C++23	Provides class template expected, a result type.
<functional>	C++98	Provides several function objects, designed for use with the standard algorithms. (See Functional (C++).)
<generator>	C++23	Provides a coroutine generator that additionally supports nested yield operations on ranges.
<memory>	C++98	Provides facilities for memory management in C++, including the class template unique_ptr. (See Allocator (C++).)
<memory_resource>	C++17	Provides facilities for creating polymorphic memory allocators whose behaviors can change at runtime. (See Allocator (C++).)
<optional>	C++17	Provides class template optional, an optional type.
<scoped_allocator>	C++11	Provides scoped_allocator_adaptor. (See Allocator (C++).)
<stacktrace>	C++23	Provides stack trace operations.
<stdexcept>	C++98	Contains standard exception classes such as logic_error and runtime_error.
<system_error>	C++11	Defines error_code and features relating to its usage.
<tuple>	C++11	Provides a class template tuple, a tuple.
<type_traits>	C++11	Provides metaprogramming facilities working with types.
<utility>	C++98	The utility file provides various utilities: class template pair (two-member tuples), compile-time integer sequences, helpers in constructing vocabulary types, functions such as move and forward, and many more. The namespace std::rel_ops for automatically generating comparison operators is deprecated in C++20 in favor of new defaulted comparison operators.
<variant>	C++17	Provides a class template variant, a tagged union type.

=== Language support ===
Components that C++ programs may use for support during development.

Name	Since	Description
<cassert>	C++98	Related to <assert.h>. Declares the assert macro, used to assist with detecting logical errors and other types of bugs while debugging a program.
<cfenv>	C++98	Related to <errno.h>. Defines a set of functions for controlling floating-point environment.
<cfloat>	C++98	Related to <float.h>. Defines macro constants specifying the implementation-specific properties of the floating-point library.
<cinttypes>	C++98	Related to <inttypes.h>. Defines exact-width integer types.
<ciso646>	C++98	Related to <iso646.h>. Defines several macros that implement alternative ways to express several standard tokens. For programming in ISO 646 variant character sets. Removed in C++20.
<climits>	C++98	Related to <limits.h>. Defines macro constants specifying the implementation-specific properties of the integer types.
<compare>	C++20	Provides three-way comparison operator support.
<coroutine>	C++20	Provides coroutine support.
<debugging>	C++26	Provides debugging support, such as breakpoints and other mechanisms to aid debuggers.
<exception>	C++98	Provides several types and functions related to exception handling, including exception, the base class of all exceptions thrown by the Standard Library.
<initializer_list>	C++11	Provides initializer list constructor support through initializer_list.
<limits>	C++98	Provides the class template numeric_limits, used for describing properties of fundamental numeric types.
<meta>	C++26	Provides reflective programming capabilities as well as symbol metadata and annotations. (See Reflection (C++).)
<new>	C++98	Provides operators new and delete and other functions and types for placement allocation.
<source_location>	C++20	Provides source location information.
<stdfloat>	C++23	Provides conditional support for extended floating-point types.
<typeinfo>	C++98	Provides facilities for working with C++ run-time type information.
<version>	C++20	Provides information through macros about the provider's implementation of language features and the standard library.

=== Containers/collections ===
Components that C++ programs may use for container data structures.

Name	Since	Description
<array>	C++11	Provides the container class template array, a container for a fixed-size array.
<bitset>	C++98	Provides the specialized container class bitset, a fixed-size bit array.
<deque>	C++98	Provides the container class template deque, a double-ended queue.
<flat_map>	C++23	Provides the container adapter class templates flat_map and flat_multimap.
<flat_set>	C++23	Provides the container adapter class templates flat_set and flat_multiset.
<forward_list>	C++11	Provides the container class template forward_list, a singly linked list.
<inplace_vector>	C++26	Provides the class inplace_vector, analogous to vector with a fixed capacity defined at compile time.
<hive>	C++26	Provides the class hive, which reuses erased elements' memory, essentially an object pool.
<map>	C++98	Provides the container class templates map and multimap, sorted associative array and multimap (typically by a red-black tree).
<mdspan>	C++23	Provides the class template mdspan, analogous to span but for multidimensional views.
<queue>	C++98	Provides the container adapter class queue, a single-ended queue, and priority_queue, a priority queue.
<set>	C++98	Provides the container class templates set and multiset, sorted associative containers or sets.
<span>	C++20	Provides the class template span, a non-owning view that refers to any contiguous range.
<stack>	C++98	Provides the container adapter class stack, a stack.
<unordered_map>	C++11	Provides the container class template unordered_map and unordered_multimap, hash tables.
<unordered_set>	C++11	Provides the container class template unordered_set and unordered_multiset.
<vector>	C++98	Provides the container class template vector, a dynamic array.

=== Iterators and ranges ===
Components that C++ programs may use to manipulate iterators, ranges, and algorithms over ranges and containers.

Name	Since	Description
<algorithm>	C++98	Provides definitions of many algorithms for use with containers and other ranges. (See Algorithm (C++).)
<iterator>	C++98	Provides classes and templates for working with iterators.
<numeric>	C++98	Generalized numeric algorithms.
<ranges>	C++20	Provides ranges facilities and lazily evaluated adapters.

=== Localisation ===
Components that C++ programs may use for localisation and character encoding manipulation.

Name	Since	Description
<clocale>	C++98	Related to <locale.h>. Defines localization functions.
<codecvt>	C++11	Provides code conversion facets for various character encodings. Deprecated since C++17, removed in C++26.
<locale>	C++98	Defines classes and declares functions that encapsulate and manipulate the information peculiar to a locale.
<text_encoding>	C++26	Provides text encoding identifications with the IANA Character Sets registry.

=== Strings ===
Components that C++ programs may use for string manipulation.

Name	Since	Description
<cctype>	C++98	Related to <ctype.h>. Defines set of functions used to classify characters by their types or to convert between upper and lower case in a way that is independent of the used character set (typically ASCII or one of its extensions, although implementations utilizing EBCDIC are also known).
<charconv>	C++17	Provides a locale-independent, non-allocating, and non-throwing string conversion utilities from/to integers and floating point.
<cstring>	C++98	Related to <string.h>. Defines string-handling functions.
<cuchar>	C++98	Related to <uchar.h>. Types and functions for manipulating Unicode characters.
<cwchar>	C++98	Related to <wchar.h>. Defines wide-string-handling functions.
<cwctype>	C++98	Related to <wctype.h>. Defines set of functions used to classify wide characters by their types or to convert between upper and lower case.
<format>	C++20	Provides string formatting utilities.
<string>	C++98	Provides the C++ standard string classes and templates.
<string_view>	C++17	Provides string_view classes, representing an immutable non-owning view to any string.
<regex>	C++11	Provides utilities for pattern matching strings using regular expressions.

=== Streams, files, and input/output ===
Components that C++ programs may use for input/output manipulation and file manipulation.

Name	Since	Description
<cstdio>	C++98	Related to <stdio.h>. Defines core input and output functions.
<filesystem>	C++17	Provides facilities for file system operations and their components.
<fstream>	C++98	Provides facilities for file-based input and output. See fstream.
<iomanip>	C++98	Provides facilities to manipulate output formatting, such as the base used when formatting integers and the precision of floating-point values.
<ios>	C++98	Provides several types and functions basic to the operation of iostreams.
<iosfwd>	C++98	Provides forward declarations of several I/O-related class templates.
<iostream>	C++98	Provides C++ input and output fundamentals. See iostream.
<istream>	C++98	Provides istream and other supporting classes for input.
<ostream>	C++98	Provides ostream and other supporting classes for output.
<print>	C++23	Provides formatted output utilities such as print supported for both C and C++ streams.
<spanstream>	C++23	Provides spanstream and other fixed character buffer I/O streams.
<sstream>	C++98	Provides stringstream and other supporting classes for string manipulation.
<streambuf>	C++98	Provides reading and writing functionality to/from certain types of character sequences, such as external files or strings.
<strstream>	C++98	Provides input/output operations on array-backed streams. Deprecated in C++98, removed in C++26.
<syncstream>	C++20	Provides osyncstream and other supporting classes for synchronized output streams.

=== Thread support library ===
Components that C++ programs may use for threading and concurrent programming.

Name	Since	Description
<atomic>	C++11	Provides class template atomic, its several template specializations, and more atomic operations.
<barrier>	C++20	Provides barrier, a reusable thread barrier.
<cstdarg>	C++98	Related to <stdarg.h>. For atomic operations on data shared between threads.
<execution>	C++17	Provides execution policies for parallelized algorithms. Expanded in C++26 with an execution control framework for asynchronous operations and tasks.
<future>	C++11	Provides components that a C++ program can use to retrieve in one thread the result (value or exception) from a function that has run in the same thread or another thread, such as future.
<hazard_pointer>	C++26	Provides hazard pointers via hazard_pointer.
<latch>	C++20	Provides latch, a single-use thread barrier.
<mutex>	C++11	Provides mechanisms for mutual exclusion: mutexes, locks, and call_once.
<rcu>	C++26	Provides read-copy-update mechanisms for safe reclamation.
<shared_mutex>	C++14	Provides facility for shared mutual exclusion.
<semaphore>	C++20	Provides semaphore utilities for non-negative resource count.
<stop_token>	C++20	Provides components that can be used to asynchronously request that an operation stops execution in a timely manner.
<thread>	C++11	Provide class thread for working with threads. Later expanded in C++20 with jthread, which automatically joins upon destruction. Also contains namespace std::this_thread for operations on the currently executing thread.

=== Numerics library ===
Components that C++ programs may use to perform seminumerical or mathematical operations.

Name	Since	Description
<bit>	C++20	Provides bit manipulation facilities.
<ccomplex>	C++98	Related to <complex.h>. Defines a set of functions for manipulating complex numbers. Deprecated in C++17, removed in C++20.
<cmath>	C++98	Related to <math.h>. Defines common mathematical functions. Extends <math.h>, containing special mathematical functions such as Bessel functions and the Riemann zeta function.
<complex>	C++98	Defines a class template complex, and numerous functions for representing and manipulating complex numbers.
<ctgmath>	C++98	Related to <tgmath.h>. Defines type-generic mathematical functions. Deprecated in C++17, removed in C++20.
<linalg>	C++26	Provides linear algebra facilities.
<numbers>	C++20	Provides mathematical constants defined in namespace std::numbers.
<simd>	C++26	Provides data-parallel types (Single instruction, multiple data or SIMD) and operations on these types.
<random>	C++11	Facility for generating (pseudo-)random numbers and distributions.
<ratio>	C++11	Provides compile-time rational arithmetic based on class templates.
<valarray>	C++98	Defines five class templates (valarray, slice_array, gslice_array, mask_array, and indirect_array), two classes (slice and gslice), and a series of related function templates for representing and manipulating arrays of values.

=== C standard library ===
Each header from the C Standard Library is included in the C++ Standard Library under a different name, generated by removing the '.h' file extension, and adding a 'c' at the start; for example, 'time.h' becomes 'ctime'. The only difference between these headers and the traditional C Standard Library headers is that where possible the functions should be placed into the std:: namespace. In ISO C, functions in the standard library are allowed to be implemented by macros, which is not allowed by ISO C++.

Usage of the C headers with the '.h' file extension was deprecated in C++98, but later undeprecated in C++23 for compatibility use; nonetheless, they remain discouraged for pure C++ code.

The following headers are special C compatibility headers which do not have a corresponding C++ naming convention, meaning that the C headers must be used if the header is necessary.

Name	Since	Description
<stdatomic.h>	C++23	For atomic operations on data shared between threads.
<stdbit.h>	C++26	For manipulating and processing bits and bit sequences.
<stdchkint.h>	C++26	For checked integers.
<stdcountof.h>	C++26	For determining the length of a C array.

The C headers <stdnoreturn.h> and <threads.h> do not have C++ equivalents and their C headers are not supported in C++.

Despite reserving the posix namespace, C++ does not provide the C POSIX library as part of any standard; most headers in the POSIX library typically have a C++ equivalent implementation, such as <regex> rather than <regex.h>.

== See also ==
- C standard library
- C POSIX library
- Windows API
- Windows.h
- Standard library
- Boost (C++ libraries)
- POCO C++ Libraries
- C++ Technical Report 1
