= User space and kernel space =

Way of using computer memory

A modern computer operating system usually uses virtual memory to provide separate address spaces or regions of a single address space, called user space and kernel space. (Note: Older operating systems, such as DOS and Windows 3.1x, do not use this architecture.) This separation primarily provides memory protection and hardware protection from malicious or errant software behaviour.

Kernel space is strictly reserved for running a privileged operating system kernel, kernel extensions, and most device drivers. In contrast, user space is the memory area where application software, daemons, and some drivers execute, typically with one address space per process.

Exploits targeting the user space are colloquially referred to as "userland exploits".

== Overview ==
The term user space (or userland) refers to all code that runs outside the operating system's kernel. User space usually refers to the various programs and libraries that the operating system uses to interact with the kernel: software that performs input/output, manipulates file system objects, application software, etc.

Each user space process usually runs in its own virtual memory space, and, unless explicitly allowed, cannot access the memory of other processes. This is the basis for memory protection in today's mainstream operating systems, and a building block for privilege separation. A separate user mode can also be used to build efficient virtual machines – see Popek and Goldberg's virtualization requirements. With enough privileges, processes can request the kernel to map part of another process's memory space to their own, as is the case for debuggers. Programs can also request shared memory regions with other processes, although other techniques are also available to allow inter-process communication.

Various layers within Linux, also showing separation between the userland and kernel space
User mode	User applications	bash, LibreOffice, GIMP, Blender, 0 A.D., Mozilla Firefox, ...				
User mode	System components	init daemon: OpenRC, runit, systemd, ...	System daemons: polkitd, smbd, sshd, udevd, ...	Windowing system: X11, Wayland, SurfaceFlinger (Android)	Graphics: Mesa, AMD Software, ...	Other libraries: GTK, Qt, EFL, SDL, SFML, FLTK, GNUstep, ...
User mode	C standard library	fopen, execv, malloc, memcpy, localtime, pthread_create, ... (up to 2000 subroutines) glibc aims to be fast, musl aims to be lightweight, uClibc targets embedded systems, bionic was written for Android, etc. All aim to be POSIX/SUS-compatible.				
Kernel mode	Linux kernel	stat, splice, dup, read, open, ioctl, write, mmap, close, exit, etc. (about 380 system calls); The Linux kernel System Call Interface (SCI), aims to be POSIX/SUS-compatible				
Kernel mode	Linux kernel	Process scheduling subsystem	IPC subsystem	Memory management subsystem	Virtual files subsystem	Networking subsystem
Kernel mode	Linux kernel	Other components: ALSA, DRI, evdev, klibc, LVM, device mapper, Linux Network Scheduler, Netfilter; Linux Security Modules: SELinux, TOMOYO, AppArmor, Smack				
Hardware (CPU, main memory, data storage devices, etc.)

== Implementation ==
The most common way of implementing a user mode separate from kernel mode involves operating system protection rings. Protection rings, in turn, are implemented using CPU modes. Typically, kernel space programs run in kernel mode, also called supervisor mode; standard applications in user space run in user mode.

Some operating systems are single address space operating systems—with a single address space for all user-mode code. (The kernel-mode code may be in the same address space, or it may be in a second address space). Other operating systems have per-process address spaces, with a separate address space for each user-mode process.

== See also ==
- BIOS
- CPU modes
- Early user space
- Memory protection
- OS-level virtualization
