= Windows.h =

C header for accessing the Windows API

<windows.h> is a source code header file that Microsoft provides for the development of programs that access the Windows API (WinAPI) via C language. It declares the WinAPI functions, associated data types and common macros.

Access to WinAPI can be enabled for a C or C++ program by including it into a source file:

#include <windows.h>

Also, the executable must be linked to each static library that either contains the function code or more commonly defines runtime, dynamic linking to a system dynamic link library (DLL). Generally, for functions in a DLL named like Abc.dll, the program must be linked to a library named like Abc.lib. For MinGW, the library name is like libAbc.dll.a.

<windows.h> is a large header file and is often consumed as a precompiled header; however, when imported as a header unit (import <windows.h>;), it is prone to bugs and macro collisions (as <windows.h> defines function-like macros like min() and max() which clash with the standard library).

== Included header files ==
Including <windows.h> results in including various other header files that are included directly or indirectly by <windows.h>. Many of these header files cannot be included on their own due to dependencies between the various header files.

Notable included header files:

=== Standard C ===
Name	Description
<ctype.h>	character classification
<stdarg.h>	variable-argument function support
<string.h>	string and buffer manipulation

=== Basic ===
Name	Description
<basetsd.h>	various types
<guiddef.h>	the GUID
<imm.h>	Input Method Editor (IME)
<winbase.h>	kernel32.dll: kernel services; advapi32.dll: kernel services (e.g. CreateProcessAsUser() function), access control (e.g. AdjustTokenGroups() function).
<wincon.h>	console services
<windef.h>	various macros and types
<winerror.h>	error codes
<wingdi.h>	Graphics Device Interface (GDI)
<winnetwk.h>	Windows Networking (WNet)
<winnls.h>	Native Language Support (NLS)
<winnt.h>	various macros and types (for Windows NT)
<winreg.h>	Windows registry
<winsvc.h>	Windows services and the Service Control Manager (SCM)
<winuser.h>	Calls on user32.dll for user services, inline resource macro (e.g. MAKEINTRESOURCE macro), inline dialog macro(e.g. DialogBox function).
<winver.h>	version information

=== Extra ===
Name	Description
<cderr.h>	CommDlgExtendedError function error codes
<commldg.h>	Common Dialog Boxes
<dde.h>	DDE (Dynamic Data Exchange)
<ddeml.h>	DDE Management Library
<dlgs.h>	various constants for Common Dialog Boxes
<lzexpand.h>	LZ (Lempel-Ziv) compression/decompression
<mmsystem.h>	Windows Multimedia
<nb30.h>	NetBIOS
<rpc.h>	RPC (Remote procedure call)
<shellapi.h>	Windows Shell API
<wincrypt.h>	Cryptographic API
<winperf.h>	Performance monitoring
<winresrc.h>	used in resources
<winsock.h>	Winsock (Windows Sockets), version 1.1
<winspool.h>	Print Spooler
<winbgim.h>	Standard graphics library

=== OLE and COM ===
Name	Description
<ole2.h>	OLE (Object Linking and Embedding)
<objbase.h>	COM (Component Object Model)
<oleauto.h>	OLE Automation
<oletlid.h>	various GUID definitions

== Macros ==
Several macros affect the definitions made by <windows.h> and the files it includes.

- UNICODE; when defined, this causes the generic text datatype TCHAR to be a synonym of WCHAR instead of CHAR, and all type-generic API functions and messages that work with text will be defined to the -W versions instead of the -A versions. It is similar to the windows C runtime's _UNICODE macro.
- RC_INVOKED defined when the resource compiler (RC.EXE) is in use instead of a C compiler.
- WINVER used to enable features only available in newer operating systems. Define it to 0x0501 for Windows XP, and 0x0600 for Windows Vista.
- WIN32_LEAN_AND_MEAN used to reduce the size of the header files and speed up compilation. Excludes things like cryptography, DDE, RPC, the Windows Shell and Winsock.

== Other languages ==
Microsoft has plans to update the Windows API for modern C++ usage with their win32metadata project. Currently, there is C++/WinRT and "Windows Implementation Library" (WIL) for doing this in modern C++. Microsoft has also created bindings for other languages, including C# and Rust for calling the Win32 API.

== See also ==
- Windows API
- Microsoft Foundation Class Library
- C POSIX library
- C standard library
- C++ standard library
