= Alpine Linux =

Linux distribution based on musl and BusyBox

- Developer: Alpine Linux Development Team
- OS family: Linux (Unix-like)
- Working state: Active
- Source model: Open source
- Initial release: August 2005; 21 years ago
- Latest release: 3.24.4 / 5 November 2026; 3 days ago
- Repository: gitlab.alpinelinux.org
- Marketing target: General-purpose. Security, embedded systems and other resource-constrained systems, such as containers.
- Available in: Multilingual
- Package manager: APK (Alpine Package Keeper)
- Supported platforms: x86; x86-64; ARMhf; ARMv7; AArch64; ppc64le; s390x; LoongArch; riscv64
- Kernel type: Monolithic (Linux)
- Userland: BusyBox
- Influenced: Nura
- Default user interface: Ash
- Official website: www.alpinelinux.org

Alpine Linux is a Linux distribution "designed for power users who appreciate security, simplicity and resource efficiency". It uses musl, BusyBox, and OpenRC instead of glibc, GNU Core Utilities, and systemd, respectively. This makes Alpine one of the few Linux distributions not to be based on systemd. For security, Alpine compiles all user-space binaries as position-independent executables with stack-smashing protection. Because of its small size and rapid startup, it is commonly used in containers providing quick boot-up times, on virtual machines (e.g., OS-level virtualization) as well as on real hardware in embedded devices, such as routers, servers and NAS.

== History ==
Originally, Alpine Linux began as an embedded-first distribution for devices such as wireless routers, based on Gentoo Linux, inspired by GNAP (Note: Gentoo Network Appliance, a discontinued derivative of Gentoo Linux) and the Bering-uClibc branch of the LEAF Project. Founder Natanael Copa has said that the name was chosen as a backronym for "A Linux-Powered Network Engine" or some such similar phrase, but that the exact phrase has since been forgotten.

Alpine's package management system, the Alpine Package Keeper (apk), (Note: Not to be confused with the apk file format used by Android) was originally a collection of shell scripts but was later rewritten in C.. APKv3 began being shipped by default in Alpine Linux v3.23 in December 2025.

In 2014, Alpine Linux switched from uClibc to musl as its C standard library.

== Derivatives ==
Nura, a Linux distribution for mobile devices, is based on Alpine Linux.

Although not based on Alpine Linux, OpenWrt, a Linux distribution for wireless routers and embedded systems, uses the Alpine Package Keeper (apk) as its package manager as of its 25.12 release.
