= Msun =

Msun may refer to:

- FreeBSD's implementation of the C mathematical functions (based on Sun Mycrosystem's FDLIBM)
- Solar mass — M_{☉}
