= Cacos =

Cacos may refer to:

- Cacos (C Standard Library)
- Cacos (military group)
