= LEAF Project =

Collection of Linux distributions dedicated to routing

LEAF (Linux Embedded Appliance Framework) Project
- Stable release: Bering-uClibc 7.5.1 / 27 September 2025
- Written in: Bourne shell
- License: GNU General Public License
- Website: leaf.sourceforge.net

The LEAF (Linux Embedded Appliance Framework) Project is a secure, feature-rich, customizable embedded Linux network appliance for use in a variety of network topologies. Although it can be used in other ways, it is primarily used as an Internet gateway, router, firewall, and wireless access point. It began as a fork from the Linux Router Project (LRP) "linux-on-a-floppy" distribution. Most users of this distribution are primarily interested in router and firewall functions, particularly as combined with the convenience of major features of general Linux distributions such as shells, packet filtering, SSH servers, DNS services, file servers, webmin and the like. LEAF is a common choice when commercial NAT routers are insufficiently flexible or secure, or are unattractively nonconforming to open source philosophy.

== Characteristics ==
LEAF is capable of running a powerful NAT firewall with several ancillary services on computer hardware generally considered obsolete, such as 486 workstations with no hard disk.

LEAF is intended to work well with read-only storage media, such as write-protected floppy drives or optical discs. Distribution sizes range from a single floppy disk to several hundred megabytes.

LEAF distributions typically include software designed to be economical in executable size, such as uClibc, BusyBox, Dropbear, and Shorewall.

LEAF's origins lie in Debian Sarge, though many boot processes and daemon control mechanisms have been modified heavily.

== See also ==
- List of router or firewall distributions
- Alpine Linux
