= CARG =

CARG may refer to:

- carg, a C function which computes argument of a complex number
- Compound annual rate of growth
