= Ctime =

in computer programming languages CTime or ctime may refer to:

- ctime(), a function in the ISO C standard library defined in the time.h standard header
- <ctime> is a standard header file for C++, equivalent to the C standard library header, <time.h>
- st_ctime, a member of the stat structure specifying the last inode change time of a file in a Unix-like filesystem
- CTime, a Microsoft ATL/MFC class for handling dates and times
- CTime, a datatype in the Haskell programming language corresponding to the C time_t type
- Time::CTime, a Perl module for interfacing with POSIX asctime
