= Broken pipe =

Broken pipe may refer to:

- The character ¦, also known as a broken bar
- The EPIPE POSIX error code
- The SIGPIPE signal in inter-process communication
