= Seekg =

Function in C++

In the C++ programming language, seekg() is a function in the <fstream> header of the C++ Standard Library for seeking to an arbitrary position in a file. This function is defined for std::ifstream class, for std::ofstream class there is a similar function seekp() (this is to avoid conflicts in case of classes that derive both std::istream and std::ostream, such as std::iostream).

namespace std {
    istream& seekg(streampos position);
    istream& seekg(streamoff offset, ios_base::seekdir dir);
}

- position is the new position in the stream buffer. This parameter is an object of type std::streampos.
- offset is an integer value of type std::streamoff representing the offset in the stream's buffer. It is relative to the dir parameter.

dir is the seeking direction. It is an object of type std::ios_base::seekdir that can take any of the following constant values:

1. std::ios_base::beg (offset from the beginning of the stream's buffer).
2. std::ios_base::cur (offset from the current position in the stream's buffer).
3. std::ios_base::end (offset from the end of the stream's buffer).

Note: If the end of file on the stream has previously been reached, seekg will not reset it but will return an error in many implementations. To clear the end of the file bit first, use the clear() method. This is a relatively common mistake and if seekg() is not performing as expected, it is wise to clear the fail bit, as shown below.

== Example of seekg ==
import std;

using std::fstream;
using std::ios;

int main() {
    // Open a new file for input/output operations discarding any current
    // content in the file (assumes a length of zero on opening)
    fstream myFile("test.txt", ios::in | ios::out | ios::trunc);
    
    // Add the characters "Hello World" to the file
    myFile << "Hello World";
    
    // Seek to 6 characters from the beginning of the file
    myFile.seekg(6, ios::beg);
    
    // Read the next 5 characters from the file into a buffer
    char buffer[6];
    myFile.read(buffer, 5);
    
    // End the buffer with a null terminating character
    buffer[5] = 0;
    
    // Output the contents read from the file and close it 
    std::println(buffer);
    
    myFile.close();
}

== Example clearing the fail bit ==
import std;

using std::ifstream;
using std::ios;
using std::string;

int main() {
    string line;

    // Creates a new ifstream object and associates it with a file passed in via the parameters.
    // The object is then checked to see if the end-of-file has been reached, if the file has data
    // then this will be false.
    ifstream myFile(argv[1], ios::in);
    std::println(myFile.eof());
    
    // Continuously loops over each line of the file until the end of the file
    while (!myFile.eof()) {
        std::getline(myFile, line);
    }    
    
    // Again outputs the end-of-file status for the stream, this time the answer will be true
    std::println(myFile.eof());
    
    // Seeks to the very beginning of the file, clearing any fail bits first (such as the end-of-file bit)
    myFile.clear();
    myFile.seekg(0, ios::beg);
    
    // Outputs the status of the stream again, the result will be false
    std::println(myFile.eof());
    
    myFile.close();
}
