= C process control =

Functions of the C standard software library

C process control refers to a group of functions in the standard library of the C programming language implementing basic process control operations. The process control operations include actions such as termination of the program with various levels of cleanup, running an external command interpreter or accessing the list of the environment operations.

== Overview of functions ==
The process control functions are defined in the stdlib.h header (cstdlib header in C++).

	Function	Description
Terminating a program	abort	causes abnormal program termination (without cleaning up)
Terminating a program	exit	causes normal program termination with cleaning up
Terminating a program	_Exit	causes normal program termination without cleaning up (C99)
Terminating a program	atexit	registers a function to be called on exit() invocation
Terminating a program	quick_exit	causes normal program termination without cleaning up, but with IO buffers flushed (C11)
Terminating a program	at_quick_exit	registers a function to be called on quick_exit() invocation
Communicating with the environment	getenv	accesses the list of the environment variables
Communicating with the environment	system	calls the host environment's command processor

== Example ==
The following is an example of communicating with the system environment in C.

#include <stdio.h>
#include <stdlib.h>

int main() {
    char* path = getenv("PATH");
    if (!path) {
        fprintf(stderr, "PATH environment variable not found.\n");
    } else {
        printf("PATH variable: %s\n", path);
    }

    printf("Listing current directory contents using system(\"ls\"):\n");
    int ret = system("ls");

    if (ret == -1) {
        fprintf(stderr, "system() call failed!");
    }

    return 0;
}
