= C alternative tokens =

C standard library header providing a set of alternative spellings of common operators

C alternative tokens refer to a set of alternative spellings of common operators in the C programming language. They are implemented as a group of macro constants in the C standard library in the <iso646.h> header. The tokens were created by Bjarne Stroustrup for the pre-standard C++ language and were added to the C standard in a 1995 amendment to the C90 standard via library to avoid the breakage of existing code.

The alternative tokens allow programmers to use C language bitwise and logical operators which could otherwise be hard to type on some international and non-QWERTY keyboards. The name of the header file they are implemented in refers to the ISO/IEC 646 standard, a 7-bit character set with a number of regional variations, some of which have accented characters in place of the punctuation marks used by C operators.

== The macros ==
The <iso646.h> header defines the following 11 macros as stated below:

Macro	Defined as
and	&&
and_eq	&=
bitand	&
bitor	|
compl	~
not	!
not_eq	!=
or	||
or_eq	|=
xor	^
xor_eq	^=

== C++ ==
The above-mentioned identifiers are operator keywords in the ISO C++ programming language and do not require the inclusion of a header file. For consistency, the C++98 standard provided both <iso646.h> and a corresponding <ciso646>. However they both had no effect, being empty. Some compilers, such as Microsoft Visual C++ have, at least in the past, required the header to be included in order to use these identifiers unless a compiler flag is set. The header <ciso646> was deprecated in C++17, and removed in C++20, while <iso646.h> was retained for compatibility with C.

== See also ==
- Digraphs and trigraphs in C
