= C string handling =

Handling of strings in the C programming language

The C programming language has a set of functions implementing operations on strings (character strings and byte strings) in its standard library. Various operations, such as copying, concatenation, tokenization and searching are supported. For character strings, the standard library uses the convention that strings are null-terminated: a string of n characters is represented as an array of n + 1 elements, the last of which is a "NUL character" with numeric value 0.

The only support for strings in the programming language proper is that the compiler translates quoted string constants into null-terminated strings.

== Definitions ==
A string is defined as a contiguous sequence of code units terminated by the first zero code unit (often called the NUL code unit). This means a string cannot contain the zero code unit, as the first one seen marks the end of the string. The length of a string is the number of code units before the zero code unit. The memory occupied by a string is always one more code unit than the length, as space is needed to store the zero terminator.

Generally, the term string means a string where the code unit is of type char, which is exactly 8 bits on all modern machines. C90 defines wide strings which use a code unit of type wchar_t, which is 16 or 32 bits on modern machines. This was intended for Unicode but it is increasingly common to use UTF-8 in normal strings for Unicode instead.

Strings are passed to functions by passing a pointer to the first code unit. Since char* and wchar_t* are different types, the functions that process wide strings are different than the ones processing normal strings and have different names.

String literals ("text" in the C source code) are converted to arrays (char[] in C, or const char[] in C++) during compilation. The result is an array of code units containing all the characters plus a trailing zero code unit. In C90 L"text" produces a wide string. A string literal can contain the zero code unit (one way is to put \0 into the source), but this will cause the string to end at that point. The rest of the literal will be placed in memory (with another zero code unit added to the end) but it is impossible to know those code units were translated from the string literal, therefore such source code is not a string literal.

== Character encodings ==
Each string ends at the first occurrence of the zero code unit of the appropriate kind (char or wchar_t). Consequently, a byte string (char*) can contain non-NUL characters in ASCII or any ASCII extension, but not characters in encodings such as UTF-16 (even though a 16-bit code unit might be nonzero, its high or low byte might be zero). The encodings that can be stored in wide strings are defined by the width of wchar_t. In most implementations, wchar_t is at least 16 bits, and so all 16-bit encodings, such as UCS-2, can be stored. If wchar_t is 32-bits, then 32-bit encodings, such as UTF-32, can be stored. (The standard requires a "type that holds any wide character", which on Windows no longer holds true since the UCS-2 to UTF-16 shift. This was recognized as a defect in the standard and fixed in C++.) C++11 and C11 add two types with explicit widths char16_t and char32_t.

Variable-width encodings can be used in both byte strings and wide strings. String length and offsets are measured in bytes or wchar_t, not in "characters", which can be confusing to beginning programmers. UTF-8 and Shift JIS are often used in C byte strings, while UTF-16 is often used in C wide strings when wchar_t is 16 bits. Truncating strings with variable-width characters using functions like strncpy can produce invalid sequences at the end of the string. This can be unsafe if the truncated parts are interpreted by code that assumes the input is valid.

Support for Unicode literals such as char foo[512] = "φωωβαρ"; (UTF-8) or wchar_t foo[512] = L"φωωβαρ"; (UTF-16 or UTF-32, depends on wchar_t) is implementation defined, and may require that the source code be in the same encoding, especially for char where compilers might just copy whatever is between the quotes. Some compilers or editors will require entering all non-ASCII characters as \xNN sequences for each byte of UTF-8, and/or \uNNNN for each word of UTF-16. Since C11 (and C++11), a new literal prefix u8 is available that guarantees UTF-8 for a bytestring literal, as in char foo[512] = u8"φωωβαρ";. Since C++20 and C23, a char8_t type was added that is meant to store UTF-8 characters and the types of u8 prefixed character and string literals were changed to char8_t and char8_t[] respectively.

== Features ==
=== Terminology ===
In historical documentation the term "character" was often used instead of "byte" for C strings, which leads many to believe that these functions somehow do not work for UTF-8. In fact all lengths are defined as being in bytes and this is true in all implementations, and these functions work as well with UTF-8 as with single-byte encodings. The BSD documentation has been fixed to make this clear, but POSIX, Linux, and Windows documentation still uses "character" in many places where "byte" or "wchar_t" is the correct term.

Functions for handling memory buffers can process sequences of bytes that include null-byte as part of the data. Names of these functions typically start with mem, as opposite to the str prefix.

=== Headers ===
Most of the functions that operate on C strings are declared in the string.h header (cstring in C++), while functions that operate on C wide strings are declared in the wchar.h header (cwchar in C++). These headers also contain declarations of functions used for handling memory buffers; the name is thus something of a misnomer.

Functions declared in string.h are extremely popular since, as a part of the C standard library, they are guaranteed to work on any platform which supports C. However, some security issues exist with these functions, such as potential buffer overflows when not used carefully and properly, causing the programmers to prefer safer and possibly less portable variants, out of which some popular ones are listed below. Some of these functions also violate const-correctness by accepting a const string pointer and returning a non-const pointer within the string. To correct this, some have been separated into two overloaded functions in the C++ version of the standard library.

=== Constants and types ===
Name	Notes
NULL	Macro expanding to the null pointer constant; that is, a constant representing a pointer value which is guaranteed not to be a valid address of an object in memory.
wchar_t	Type used for a code unit in "wide" strings. The C standard only requires that wchar_t be wide enough to hold the widest character set among the supported system locales and be greater or equal in size to char. On Windows, the only platform to use wchar_t extensively, it's defined as 16-bit which was enough to represent any Unicode (UCS-2) character, but is now only enough to represent a UTF-16 code unit, which can be half a code point. On other platforms it is defined as 32-bit and a Unicode code point always fits. This difference makes code using wchar_t non-portable.
wint_t	Integer type that can hold any value of a wchar_t as well as the value of the macro WEOF. Usually a 32 bit signed value.
char8_t	Part of the C standard since C23, in <uchar.h>, a type that is suitable for storing UTF-8 characters.
char16_t	Part of the C standard since C11, in <uchar.h>, a type capable of holding 16 bits even if wchar_t is another size. If the macro __STDC_UTF_16__ is defined as 1, the type is used for UTF-16 on that system. This is always the case in C23. C++ does not define such a macro, but the type is always used for UTF-16 in that language.
char32_t	Part of the C standard since C11, in <uchar.h>, a type capable of holding 32 bits even if wchar_t is another size. If the macro __STDC_UTF_32__ is defined as 1, the type is used for UTF-32 on that system. This is always the case in C23. C++ does not define such a macro, but the type is always used for UTF-32 in that language.
mbstate_t	Contains all the information about the conversion state required from one call to a function to the other.

=== Functions ===
	Byte string	Wide string	Description (Note: For wide string functions substitute wchar_t for "byte" in the description)
String manipulation	strcpy	wcscpy	Copies one string to another
String manipulation	strncpy	wcsncpy	Writes exactly n bytes, copying from source or adding nulls
String manipulation	strcat	wcscat	Appends one string to another
String manipulation	strncat	wcsncat	Appends no more than n bytes from one string to another
String manipulation	strxfrm	wcsxfrm	Transforms a string according to the current locale
String examination	strlen	wcslen	Returns the length of the string
String examination	strcmp	wcscmp	Compares two strings (three-way comparison)
String examination	strncmp	wcsncmp	Compares a specific number of bytes in two strings
String examination	strcoll	wcscoll	Compares two strings according to the current locale
String examination	strchr	wcschr	Finds the first occurrence of a byte in a string
String examination	strrchr	wcsrchr	Finds the last occurrence of a byte in a string
String examination	strspn	wcsspn	Returns the number of initial bytes in a string that are in a second string
String examination	strcspn	wcscspn	Returns the number of initial bytes in a string that are not in a second string
String examination	strpbrk	wcspbrk	Finds in a string the first occurrence of a byte in a set
String examination	strstr	wcsstr	Finds the first occurrence of a substring in a string
String examination	strtok	wcstok	Splits a string into tokens
Miscellaneous	strerror	—N/a	Returns a string containing a message derived from an error code
Memory manipulation	memset	wmemset	Fills a buffer with a repeated byte. Since C23, memset_explicit() was added to erase sensitive data.
Memory manipulation	memcpy	wmemcpy	Copies one buffer to another. Since C23, memccpy() was added to efficiently concatenate strings.
Memory manipulation	memmove	wmemmove	Copies one buffer to another, possibly overlapping, buffer
Memory manipulation	memcmp	wmemcmp	Compares two buffers (three-way comparison)
Memory manipulation	memchr	wmemchr	Finds the first occurrence of a byte in a buffer

==== Multibyte functions ====
Name	Description
mblen	Returns the number of bytes in the next multibyte character
mbtowc	Converts the next multibyte character to a wide character
wctomb	Converts a wide character to its multibyte representation
mbstowcs	Converts a multibyte string to a wide string
wcstombs	Converts a wide string to a multibyte string
btowc	Converts a single-byte character to wide character, if possible
wctob	Converts a wide character to a single-byte character, if possible
mbsinit	Checks if a state object represents initial state
mbrlen	Returns the number of bytes in the next multibyte character, given state
mbrtowc	Converts the next multibyte character to a wide character, given state
wcrtomb	Converts a wide character to its multibyte representation, given state
mbsrtowcs	Converts a multibyte string to a wide string, given state
wcsrtombs	Converts a wide string to a multibyte string, given state
mbrtoc8	Converts the next multibyte character to a UTF-8 character, given state
c8rtomb	Converts a single code point from UTF-8 to a narrow multibyte character representation, given state
mbrtoc16	Converts the next multibyte character to a UTF-16 character, given state
c16rtomb	Converts a single code point from UTF-16 to a narrow multibyte character representation, given state
mbrtoc32	Converts the next multibyte character to a UTF-32 character, given state
c32rtomb	Converts a single code point from UTF-32 to a narrow multibyte character representation, given state

These functions all need a mbstate_t object, originally in static memory (making the functions not be thread-safe) and in later additions the caller must maintain. This was originally intended to track shift states in the mb encodings, but modern ones such as UTF-8 do not need this. However these functions were designed on the assumption that the wc encoding is not a variable-width encoding and thus are designed to deal with exactly one wchar_t at a time, passing it by value rather than using a string pointer. As UTF-16 is a variable-width encoding, the mbstate_t has been reused to keep track of surrogate pairs in the wide encoding, though the caller must still detect and call mbtowc twice for a single character. Later additions to the standard admit that the only conversion programmers are interested in is between UTF-8 and UTF-16 and directly provide this.

=== Numeric conversions ===
Byte string	Wide string	Description (Note: Here string refers either to byte string or wide string)
atof	—N/a	converts a string to a floating-point value ('atof' means 'ASCII to float')
atoi atol atoll	—N/a	converts a string to an integer (C99) ('atoi' means 'ASCII to integer')
strtof (C99) strtod strtold (C99)	wcstof (C99) wcstod wcstold (C99)	converts a string to a floating-point value
strtol strtoll	wcstol wcstoll	converts a string to a signed integer
strtoul strtoull	wcstoul wcstoull	converts a string to an unsigned integer

The C standard library contains several functions for numeric conversions. The functions that deal with byte strings are defined in the stdlib.h header (cstdlib header in C++). The functions that deal with wide strings are defined in the wchar.h header (cwchar header in C++).

The functions strchr, bsearch, strpbrk, strrchr, strstr, memchr and their wide counterparts are not const-correct, since they accept a const string pointer and return a non-const pointer within the string. This has been fixed in C23.

Also, since the Normative Amendment 1 (C95), atoxx functions are considered subsumed by strtoxxx functions, for which reason neither C95 nor any later standard provides wide-character versions of these functions. The argument against atoxx is that they do not differentiate between an error and a 0.

== Popular extensions ==
Several related standards have extended the string handling functionality provided by standard C, including BSD, SVID, and POSIX. Some such functions have been added in more recent C standards (e.g. C11 and C23).

Name	Source	Description
bzero	4.2BSD, POSIX.1-2001	Zeros out a buffer. Deprecated by memset and removed in POSIX.1-2008.
memccpy	4.4BSD, SVID4, POSIX.1-2001, C23	Copies between two non-overlapping buffers, stopping when a given byte is found.
mempcpy	GNU	Copies between two non-overlapping buffers, returning a pointer to the byte following the last written byte.
strcasecmp, strncasecmp	4.4BSD, POSIX.1-2001	Case-insensitive versions of strcmp and strncmp, respectively.
strcat_s, strncat_s	Windows, C11	Bounds-checking versions of strcat and strncat, respectively.
strcpy_s, strncpy_s	Windows, C11	Bounds-checking versions of strcpy and strncpy, respectively.
strdup, strndup	POSIX.1-2001, C23	Allocates memory and duplicates a string into it.
strerror_r	POSIX.1-2001, GNU	A thread-safe version of strerror. The GNU variant is incompatible with the POSIX one.
strlcpy	POSIX.1-2024	A variant of strcpy that truncates the result to fit in the destination buffer.
strlcat	POSIX.1-2024	A variant of strcat that truncates the result to fit in the destination buffer.
strsignal	SVID3, POSIX.1-2008	Returns a string representation of a signal code.
strtok_r	POSIX.1-1996	A thread-safe version of strtok.

== strlcpy, strlcat ==
Despite the well-established need to replace strcat and strcpy with functions that do not allow buffer overflows, no accepted standard has arisen. This is partly due to the mistaken belief by many C programmers that strncat and strncpy have the desired behavior; however, neither function was designed for this (they were intended to manipulate null-padded fixed-size string buffers, a data format less commonly used in modern software), and the behavior and arguments are non-intuitive and often written incorrectly even by expert programmers.

The most popular (Note: On GitHub, there are 7,813,206 uses of strlcpy, versus 38,644 uses of strcpy_s (and 15,286,150 uses of strcpy).) replacement are the strlcat and strlcpy functions, which appeared in OpenBSD 2.4 in December, 1998. These functions always write one NUL to the destination buffer, truncating the result if necessary, and return the size of buffer that would be needed, which allows detection of the truncation and provides a size for creating a new buffer that will not truncate. For a long time they have not been included in the GNU C library (used by software on Linux), on the basis of allegedly being inefficient, encouraging the use of C strings (instead of some superior alternative form of string), and hiding other potential errors. Even while glibc hadn't added support, strlcat and strlcpy have been implemented in a number of other C libraries including ones for OpenBSD, FreeBSD, NetBSD, Solaris, OS X, and QNX, as well as in alternative C libraries for Linux, such as libbsd, introduced in 2008, and musl, introduced in 2011, and the source code added directly to other projects such as SDL, GLib, ffmpeg, rsync, and even internally in the Linux kernel. This did change in 2024, the glibc FAQ notes that as of glibc 2.38, the code has been committed and thereby added. These functions were standardized as part of POSIX.1-2024, the Austin Group Defect Tracker ID 986 tracked some discussion about such plans for POSIX.

As part of its 2004 Security Development Lifecycle, Microsoft introduced a family of "secure" functions including strcpy_s and strcat_s (along with many others). These functions were standardized with some minor changes as part of the optional C11 (Annex K) proposed by ISO/IEC WDTR 24731. These functions perform various checks including whether the string is too long to fit in the buffer. If the checks fail, a user-specified "runtime-constraint handler" function is called, which usually aborts the program. These functions attracted considerable criticism because initially they were implemented only on Windows and at the same time warning messages started to be produced by Microsoft Visual C++ suggesting use of these functions instead of standard ones. This has been speculated by some to be an attempt by Microsoft to lock developers into its platform. Experience with these functions has shown significant problems with their adoption and errors in usage, so the removal of Annex K was proposed for the next revision of the C standard. Usage of memset_s has been suggested as a way to avoid unwanted compiler optimizations.

== See also ==
- C syntax § Strings – source code syntax, including backslash escape sequences
- C++ string handling
- String functions
- Perl Compatible Regular Expressions (PCRE)
