= UClibc =

Implementation of C standard library for embedded systems based on Linux

uClibc
- Developer: Erik Andersen
- Release: February 13, 2000; 26 years ago
- Final release: 0.9.33.2 (May 15, 2012; 14 years ago) [±]
- Written in: C
- Operating system: Linux
- Platform: Embedded Linux
- Type: Runtime library; C standard library
- License: LGPLv2.1
- Website: uclibc.org
- Repository: git.uclibc.org/uClibc/

uClibc-ng
- Stable release: 1.0.58 / May 24, 2026; 5 months ago
- Website: uclibc-ng.org
- Repository: github.com/wbx-github/uclibc-ng

In computing, uClibc (sometimes written μClibc) is a small C standard library intended for Linux kernel-based operating systems for embedded systems and mobile devices. uClibc was written to support μClinux, a version of Linux not requiring a memory management unit and thus suited for microcontrollers (uCs; the "u" is a Latin script typographical approximation - not a proper romanization, which would be letter "m" - of μ for "micro").

Development on uClibc started around 1999. uClibc was mostly written from scratch, but has incorporated code from glibc and other projects. The project lead is Erik Andersen, and the other main contributor is Manuel Novoa III. Licensed under the GNU Lesser General Public License, uClibc is free and open-source software.

uClibc is a wrapper around the system calls of the Linux kernel and μClinux.

uClibc is much smaller than the glibc, the C library normally used with Linux distributions. While glibc is intended to fully support all relevant C standards across a wide range of hardware and kernel platforms, uClibc is specifically focused on embedded Linux systems. Features can be enabled or disabled according to space requirements.

uClibc runs on standard and MMU-less Linux systems. It supports i386, x86-64, ARM (big/little endian), Atmel AVR32, Analog Devices Blackfin, Renesas/Hitachi H8 (h8300), Motorola m68k, MIPS (big/little endian), IBM PowerPC, SuperH (big/little endian), Sun SPARC, and Renesas/NEC v850 processors.

uClibc-ng is a fork of uClibc announced on the OpenWRT mailing list in July 2014 after more than two years had passed without a uClibc release, citing a lack of any communication from the maintainer. At present, the original project's author no longer publishes updates, but refers to the still actively developed fork uClibc-ng for current releases.

== See also ==
- Alpine Linux
- Buildroot
- busybox
- Contiki
- OpenWrt
- musl
- Linux for embedded systems
- Linux for mobile devices
