= Errno.h =

Header file for C programs

<errno.h> is a header file in the standard library of the C programming language. It defines macros for reporting and retrieving error conditions using the symbol errno (short form for "error number").

errno acts like an integer variable. A value (the error number) is stored in errno by certain library functions when they detect errors. At program startup, the value stored is zero. Library functions store only values greater than zero. Any library function can alter the value stored before return, whether or not they detect errors. Most functions indicate that they detected an error by returning a special value, typically NULL for functions that return pointers, and -1 for functions that return integers. A few functions require the caller to preset errno to 0 and test it afterwards to see if an error was detected.

The errno macro expands to an lvalue with type int, sometimes with the extern and/or volatile type specifiers depending upon the platform. Originally this was a static memory location, but macros are almost always used today to allow for multi-threading, so that each thread will see its own thread-local error number.

The header file also defines macros that expand to integer constants that represent the error codes. The C standard library only requires three to be defined:

EDOM	A parameter was outside a function's domain, e.g. sqrt(-1)
ERANGE	A result outside a function's range, e.g. strtol("0xfffffffff", NULL, 0) on systems with a 32-bit wide long
EILSEQ	(Required since 1994 Amendment 1 to C89 standard); Illegal byte sequence, e.g. mbstowcs(buf, "\xff", 1) on systems that use UTF-8.

POSIX compliant operating systems like AIX, Linux or Solaris include many other error values, many of which are used much more often than the above ones, such as EACCES for when a file cannot be opened for reading. C++11 additionally defines many of the same values found within the POSIX specification.

Traditionally, the first page of Unix system manuals, named intro(2), lists all errno.h macros, but this is not the case with Linux, where these macros are instead listed in the errno(3).

An errno can be translated to a descriptive string using strerror (defined in <string.h>) or a BSD extension called sys_errlist. The translation can be printed directly to the standard error stream using perror (defined in <stdio.h>). As strerror in many Unix-like systems is not thread-safe, a thread-safe version strerror_r is used, but conflicting definitions from POSIX and GNU makes it even less portable than the sys_errlist table.

== POSIX errors ==
The GNU C library (GLIBC) provides the additional POSIX error values macros in the header file <errno.h>. These are the descriptions of the macros provided by strerror.

Symbol	Value	Description
EPERM	1	Operation not permitted
ENOENT	2	No such file or directory
ESRCH	3	No such process
EINTR	4	Interrupted system call
EIO	5	Input/output error
ENXIO	6	No such device or address
E2BIG	7	Argument list too long
ENOEXEC	8	Exec format error
EBADF	9	Bad file descriptor
ECHILD	10	No child processes
EAGAIN	11	Resource temporarily unavailable
ENOMEM	12	Cannot allocate memory
EACCES	13	Permission denied
EFAULT	14	Bad address
ENOTBLK	15	Block device required
EBUSY	16	Device or resource busy
EEXIST	17	File exists
EXDEV	18	Invalid cross-device link
ENODEV	19	No such device
ENOTDIR	20	Not a directory
EISDIR	21	Is a directory
EINVAL	22	Invalid argument
ENFILE	23	Too many open files in system
EMFILE	24	Too many open files
ENOTTY	25	Inappropriate ioctl for device
ETXTBSY	26	Text file busy
EFBIG	27	File too large
ENOSPC	28	No space left on device
ESPIPE	29	Illegal seek
EROFS	30	Read-only file system
EMLINK	31	Too many links
EPIPE	32	Broken pipe
EDOM	33	Numerical argument out of domain
ERANGE	34	Numerical result out of range
EDEADLK	35	Resource deadlock avoided
ENAMETOOLONG	36	File name too long
ENOLCK	37	No locks available
ENOSYS	38	Function not implemented
ENOTEMPTY	39	Directory not empty
ELOOP	40	Too many levels of symbolic links
ENOMSG	42	No message of desired type
EIDRM	43	Identifier removed
ECHRNG	44	Channel number out of range
EL2NSYNC	45	Level 2 not synchronized
EL3HLT	46	Level 3 halted
EL3RST	47	Level 3 reset
ELNRNG	48	Link number out of range
EUNATCH	49	Protocol driver not attached
ENOCSI	50	No CSI structure available
EL2HLT	51	Level 2 halted
EBADE	52	Invalid exchange
EBADR	53	Invalid request descriptor
EXFULL	54	Exchange full
ENOANO	55	No anode
EBADRQC	56	Invalid request code
EBADSLT	57	Invalid slot
EBFONT	59	Bad font file format
ENOSTR	60	Device not a stream
ENODATA	61	No data available
ETIME	62	Timer expired
ENOSR	63	Out of streams resources
ENONET	64	Machine is not on the network
ENOPKG	65	Package not installed
EREMOTE	66	Object is remote
ENOLINK	67	Link has been severed
EADV	68	Advertise error
ESRMNT	69	Srmount error
ECOMM	70	Communication error on send
EPROTO	71	Protocol error
EMULTIHOP	72	Multihop attempted
EDOTDOT	73	RFS specific error
EBADMSG	74	Bad message
EOVERFLOW	75	Value too large to be stored in data type
ENOTUNIQ	76	Name not unique on network
EBADFD	77	File descriptor in bad state
EREMCHG	78	Remote address changed
ELIBACC	79	Can not access a needed shared library
ELIBBAD	80	Accessing a corrupted shared library
ELIBSCN	81	.lib section in a.out corrupted
ELIBMAX	82	Attempting to link in too many shared libraries
ELIBEXEC	83	Cannot exec a shared library directly
EILSEQ	84	Illegal byte sequence
ERESTART	85	Interrupted system call should be restarted
ESTRPIPE	86	Streams pipe error
EUSERS	87	Too many users
ENOTSOCK	88	Socket operation on non-socket
EDESTADDRREQ	89	Destination address required
EMSGSIZE	90	Message too long
EPROTOTYPE	91	Protocol wrong type for socket
ENOPROTOOPT	92	Protocol not available
EPROTONOSUPPORT	93	Protocol not supported
ESOCKTNOSUPPORT	94	Socket type not supported
EOPNOTSUPP	95	Operation not supported
EPFNOSUPPORT	96	Protocol family not supported
EAFNOSUPPORT	97	Address family not supported by protocol
EADDRINUSE	98	Address already in use
EADDRNOTAVAIL	99	Cannot assign requested address
ENETDOWN	100	Network is down
ENETUNREACH	101	Network is unreachable
ENETRESET	102	Network dropped connection on reset
ECONNABORTED	103	Software caused connection abort
ECONNRESET	104	Connection reset by peer
ENOBUFS	105	No buffer space available. This condition caused by lack of memory in the OS's buffers.
EISCONN	106	Transport endpoint is already connected
ENOTCONN	107	Transport endpoint is not connected
ESHUTDOWN	108	Cannot send after transport endpoint shutdown
ETOOMANYREFS	109	Too many references: cannot splice
ETIMEDOUT	110	Connection timed out
ECONNREFUSED	111	Connection refused
EHOSTDOWN	112	Host is down
EHOSTUNREACH	113	No route to host
EALREADY	114	Operation already in progress
EINPROGRESS	115	Operation now in progress
ESTALE	116	Stale file handle
EUCLEAN	117	Structure needs cleaning
ENOTNAM	118	Not a Xenix named type file
ENAVAIL	119	No Xenix semaphores available
EISNAM	120	Is a named type file
EREMOTEIO	121	Remote I/O error
EDQUOT	122	Disk quota exceeded
ENOMEDIUM	123	No medium found
EMEDIUMTYPE	124	Wrong medium type
ECANCELED	125	Operation canceled
ENOKEY	126	Required key not available
EKEYEXPIRED	127	Key has expired
EKEYREVOKED	128	Key has been revoked
EKEYREJECTED	129	Key was rejected by service
EOWNERDEAD	130	Previous owner died
ENOTRECOVERABLE	131	State not recoverable
ERFKILL	132	Operation not possible due to RF-kill
EHWPOISON	133	Memory page has hardware error
ENOTSUP	134	Not supported parameter or option

The macro names and meanings for error codes are defined in the POSIX Standards definition however the numeric values are NOT, though by convention the values appear to be the same across different versions of Unix. Programs should not rely on specific numeric values and should test code using the macro names specified in the ERRORS section of the man page of the associated function. For source code readability and portability the use of the standard macro names in code is highly recommended.

== See also ==
- perror
- strerror

== Bibliography ==
- Stevens, W. Richard; Rago, Stephen A. (May 24, 2013). Advanced Programming in the UNIX Environment (Third ed.). Addison-Wesley Professional. ISBN 978-0321637734.
