= C character classification =

Operations in the C standard library that classify characters

C character classification is a group of operations in the C standard library that test a character for membership in a particular class of characters, such as alphabetic characters or control characters. Both single-byte and wide characters are supported.

== History ==
Early C programmers working on the Unix operating system developed programming idioms for classifying characters. For example, the following code evaluates as true for an ASCII letter character c:

('A' <= c && c <= 'Z') || ('a' <= c && c <= 'z')

Eventually, the interface to common character classification functionality was codified in the C standard library file ctype.h.

== Implementation ==
For performance, the standard character classification functions are usually implemented as macros instead of functions. But, due to limitations of macro evaluation, they are generally not implemented today as they were in early versions of Linux like:

#define isdigit(c) ((c) >= '0' && (c) <= '9')

This can lead to an error when the macro parameter x is expanded to an expression with a side effect; for example: isdigit(x++). If the implementation was a function, then x would be incremented only once. But for this macro definition it is incremented twice.

To eliminate this problem, a common implementation is for the macro to use table lookup. For example, the standard library provides an array of 256 integers – one for each character value – that each contain a bit-field for each supported classification. A macro references an integer by character value index and accesses the associated bit-field. For example, if the low bit indicates whether the character is a digit, then the isdigit macro could be written as:

#define isdigit(c) (TABLE[c] & 1)

The macro argument, c, is referenced only once, so is evaluated only once.

== Overview of functions ==
The functions that operate on single-byte characters are defined in ctype.h header file (cctype in C++). The functions that operate on wide characters are defined in wctype.h header file (cwctype in C++).

The classification is evaluated according to the effective locale.

Byte character	Wide character	Description
isalnum	iswalnum	checks whether the operand is alphanumeric
isalpha	iswalpha	checks whether the operand is alphabetic
islower	iswlower	checks whether the operand is lowercase
isupper	iswupper	checks whether the operand is an uppercase
isdigit	iswdigit	checks whether the operand is a digit
isxdigit	iswxdigit	checks whether the operand is hexadecimal
iscntrl	iswcntrl	checks whether the operand is a control character
isgraph	iswgraph	checks whether the operand is a graphical character
isspace	iswspace	checks whether the operand is space
isblank	iswblank	checks whether the operand is a blank space character
isprint	iswprint	checks whether the operand is a printable character
ispunct	iswpunct	checks whether the operand is punctuation
tolower	towlower	converts the operand to lowercase
toupper	towupper	converts the operand to uppercase
—	iswctype	checks whether the operand falls into specific class
—	towctrans	converts the operand using a specific mapping
—	wctype	returns a wide character class to be used with iswctype
—	wctrans	returns a transformation mapping to be used with towctrans
