= C localization functions =

In computing, C localization functions are a group of functions in the C programming language implementing basic localization routines. The functions are used in multilingual programs to adapt to the specific locale. In particular, the way of displaying of numbers and currency can be modified. These settings affect the behaviour of input/output functions in the C Standard Library.

== Overview of functions ==
C localization functions and types are defined in locale.h (clocale header in C++).

Function	Description
setlocale	sets and gets the current C locale
localeconv	returns numeric and monetary formatting details of the current locale

== Criticism ==
The localization state is stored globally. This means that in a given program all operations involving a locale can use only one locale at a time. As a result, it is very difficult to implement programs that use more than one locale.

The functions alter the behavior of printf, scanf, strtod and other functions which are often used to write saved data to a file or to other programs. The result is that a saved file in one locale will not be readable in another locale, or not be readable at all due to assumptions such as "numbers don't have commas in them". Most large-scale software forces the locale to "C" (or another fixed value) to work around these problems.

== Example ==
#include <locale.h>
#include <stdio.h>
#include <stdlib.h>

int main(void) {
    /* Locale is set to "C" before this. This call sets it
       to the "current locale" by reading environment variables: */
    setlocale(LC_ALL, "");

    const struct lconv* const currentlocale = localeconv();

    printf("In the current locale, the default currency symbol is: %s\n", currentlocale->currency_symbol);

    return EXIT_SUCCESS;
}

== See also ==
- Locale (computer software)
