= C mathematical functions =

C standard library header file

C mathematical operations are a group of functions in the standard library of the C programming language implementing basic mathematical functions. The C++ standard library, which provides the same C math functions in the <cmath> header (placed in namespace std), provides additional mathematical special functions in this header.

== Overview of functions ==
Most of the mathematical functions, which use floating-point numbers, are defined in <math.h> (<cmath> header in C++). The functions that operate on integers, such as abs(), labs(), div(), and ldiv(), are instead defined in the <stdlib.h> header (<cstdlib> header in C++).

Any functions that operate on angles use radians as the unit of angle.

Not all of these functions are available in the C89 version of the standard. For those that are, the functions accept only type double for the floating-point arguments, leading to expensive type conversions in code that otherwise used single-precision float values. In C99, this shortcoming was fixed by introducing new sets of functions that work on float and long double arguments. Those functions are identified by f and l suffixes respectively.

In C++26, many of these functions are made constexpr.

	Function	Description
	abs labs llabs	computes absolute value of an integer value
	fabs	computes absolute value of a floating-point value
	div ldiv lldiv	computes the quotient and remainder of integer division
	fmod	remainder of the floating-point division operation
	remainder	signed remainder of the division operation
	remquo	signed remainder as well as the three last bits of the division operation
	fma	fused multiply-add operation
	fmax	larger of two floating-point values
	fmin	smaller of two floating-point values
	fdim	positive difference of two floating-point values
	nan nanf nanl	returns a NaN (not-a-number)
Exponential functions	exp	returns e raised to the given power
Exponential functions	exp2	returns 2 raised to the given power
Exponential functions	expm1	returns e raised to the given power, minus one
Exponential functions	log	computes natural logarithm (to base e)
Exponential functions	log2	computes binary logarithm (to base 2)
Exponential functions	log10	computes common logarithm (to base 10)
Exponential functions	log1p	computes natural logarithm (to base e) of 1 plus the given number
Exponential functions	ilogb	extracts exponent of the number
Exponential functions	logb	extracts exponent of the number
Power functions	sqrt	computes square root
Power functions	cbrt	computes cubic root
Power functions	hypot	computes square root of the sum of the squares of two given numbers
Power functions	pow	raises a number to the given power
Trigonometric functions	sin	computes sine
Trigonometric functions	cos	computes cosine
Trigonometric functions	tan	computes tangent
Trigonometric functions	asin	computes arc sine
Trigonometric functions	acos	computes arc cosine
Trigonometric functions	atan	computes arc tangent
Trigonometric functions	atan2	computes arc tangent, using signs to determine quadrants
Hyperbolic functions	sinh	computes hyperbolic sine
Hyperbolic functions	cosh	computes hyperbolic cosine
Hyperbolic functions	tanh	computes hyperbolic tangent
Hyperbolic functions	asinh	computes hyperbolic arc sine
Hyperbolic functions	acosh	computes hyperbolic arc cosine
Hyperbolic functions	atanh	computes hyperbolic arc tangent
Error and gamma functions	erf	computes error function
Error and gamma functions	erfc	computes complementary error function
Error and gamma functions	lgamma	computes natural logarithm of the absolute value of the gamma function
Error and gamma functions	tgamma	computes gamma function
Nearest integer floating- point operations	ceil	returns the nearest integer not less than the given value
Nearest integer floating- point operations	floor	returns the nearest integer not greater than the given value
Nearest integer floating- point operations	trunc	returns the nearest integer not greater in magnitude than the given value
Nearest integer floating- point operations	round lround llround	returns the nearest integer, rounding away from zero in halfway cases
Nearest integer floating- point operations	nearbyint	returns the nearest integer using current rounding mode
Nearest integer floating- point operations	rint lrint llrint	returns the nearest integer using current rounding mode with exception if the result differs
Floating- point manipulation functions	frexp	decomposes a number into significand and a power of 2
Floating- point manipulation functions	ldexp	multiplies a number by 2 raised to a power
Floating- point manipulation functions	modf	decomposes a number into integer and fractional parts
Floating- point manipulation functions	scalbn scalbln	multiplies a number by FLT_RADIX raised to a power
Floating- point manipulation functions	nextafter nexttoward	returns next representable floating-point value towards the given value
Floating- point manipulation functions	copysign	copies the sign of a floating-point value
Classification	fpclassify	categorizes the given floating-point value
Classification	isfinite	checks if the argument has finite value
Classification	isinf	checks if the argument is infinite
Classification	isnan	checks if the argument is NaN
Classification	isnormal	checks if the argument is normal
Classification	signbit	checks if the sign of the argument is negative

=== Floating-point environment ===
C99 adds several functions and types for fine-grained control of floating-point environment. These functions can be used to control a variety of settings that affect floating-point computations, for example, the rounding mode, on what conditions exceptions occur, when numbers are flushed to zero, etc. The floating-point environment functions and types are defined in <fenv.h> header (<cfenv> in C++).

Function	Description
feclearexcept	clears exceptions (C99)
fegetenv	stores current floating-point environment (C99)
fegetexceptflag	stores current status flags (C99)
fegetround	retrieves current rounding direction (C99)
feholdexcept	saves current floating-point environment and clears all exceptions (C99)
feraiseexcept	raises a floating-point exception (C99)
fesetenv	sets current floating-point environment (C99)
fesetexceptflag	sets current status flags (C99)
fesetround	sets current rounding direction (C99)
fetestexcept	tests whether certain exceptions have been raised (C99)
feupdateenv	restores floating-point environment, but keeps current exceptions (C99)

=== Complex numbers ===
C99 adds a new _Complex keyword (and complex convenience macro; only available if the <complex.h> header is included) that provides support for complex numbers. Any floating-point type can be modified with complex, and is then defined as a pair of floating-point numbers. Note that C and C++ do not implement complex numbers in a code-compatible way – the latter instead provides the class std::complex<T> (for a floating point type T), which provides methods with constexpr support.

All operations on complex numbers are defined in the <complex.h> header. As with the real-valued functions, an f or l suffix denotes the float complex or long double complex variant of the function.

	Function	Description
Basic operations	cabs	computes absolute value (C99)
Basic operations	carg	computes argument of a complex number (C99)
Basic operations	cimag	computes imaginary part of a complex number (C99)
Basic operations	creal	computes real part of a complex number (C99)
Basic operations	conj	computes complex conjugate (C99)
Basic operations	cproj	computes complex projection into the Riemann sphere (C99)
Exponentiation operations	cexp	computes complex exponential (C99)
Exponentiation operations	clog	computes complex logarithm (C99)
Exponentiation operations	csqrt	computes complex square root (C99)
Exponentiation operations	cpow	computes complex power (C99)
Trigonometric operations	csin	computes complex sine (C99)
Trigonometric operations	ccos	computes complex cosine (C99)
Trigonometric operations	ctan	computes complex tangent (C99)
Trigonometric operations	casin	computes complex arc sine (C99)
Trigonometric operations	cacos	computes complex arc cosine (C99)
Trigonometric operations	catan	computes complex arc tangent (C99)
Hyperbolic operations	csinh	computes complex hyperbolic sine (C99)
Hyperbolic operations	ccosh	computes complex hyperbolic cosine (C99)
Hyperbolic operations	ctanh	computes complex hyperbolic tangent (C99)
Hyperbolic operations	casinh	computes complex hyperbolic arc sine (C99)
Hyperbolic operations	cacosh	computes complex hyperbolic arc cosine (C99)
Hyperbolic operations	catanh	computes complex hyperbolic arc tangent (C99)

A few more complex functions are "reserved for future use in C99". Implementations are provided by open-source projects that are not part of the standard library.

	Function	Description
Error functions	cerf	computes the complex error function (C99)
Error functions	cerfc	computes the complex complementary error function (C99)

=== Type-generic functions ===
The header <tgmath.h> defines a type-generic macro for each mathematical function defined in <math.h> and <complex.h>. This adds a limited support for function overloading of the mathematical functions: the same function name can be used with different types of parameters; the actual function will be selected at compile time according to the types of the parameters.

Each type-generic macro that corresponds to a function that is defined for both real and complex numbers encapsulates a total of 6 different functions: float, double and long double, and their complex variants. The type-generic macros that correspond to a function that is defined for only real numbers encapsulates a total of 3 different functions: float, double and long double variants of the function.

The C++ language includes native support for function overloading and thus does not provide the <tgmath.h> header even as a compatibility feature.

=== Random-number generation ===
The header <stdlib.h> (<cstdlib> in C++) defines several functions that can be used for statistically random number generation.

Function	Description
rand	generates a pseudo-random number between 0 and RAND_MAX, inclusive.
srand	initializes a pseudo-random number generator
arc4random	generates a pseudo-random number between 0 and UINT32_MAX, usually using a better algorithm than rand
arc4random_uniform	generates a pseudo-random number between 0 and a maximum value.
arc4random_buf	fill a buffer with a pseudo-random bitstream.
arc4random_stir	initializes a pseudo-random number generator.

The arc4random family of random number functions are not defined in POSIX standard, but is found in some common libc implementations. It used to refer to the keystream generator of a leaked version of RC4 cipher (hence "alleged RC4"), but different algorithms, usually from other ciphers like ChaCha20, have been implemented since using the same name.

The quality of randomness from rand() are usually too weak to be even considered statistically random, and it requires explicit seeding. It is usually advised to use arc4random instead of rand when possible. Some C libraries implement rand using arc4random_uniform internally.

The C++ standard library provides another header, <random>, for its own random number generation facilities, in particular random number engines and probability distributions.

=== Special functions ===
Beginning in C++17, C++ introduces special functions into the <cmath> header.

Function	Description
assoc_laguerre	computes associated Laguerre polynomials
assoc_legendre	computes associated Legendre polynomials
beta	computes beta function
comp_ellint_1	computes complete elliptic integral of the first kind
comp_ellint_2	computes complete elliptic integral of the second kind
comp_ellint_3	computes complete elliptic integral of the third kind
cyl_bessel_i	computes regular modified cylindrical Bessel functions
cyl_bessel_j	computes cylindrical Bessel functions of the first kind
cyl_bessel_k	computes irregular modified cylindrical Bessel functions
cyl_neumann	computes cylindrical Neumann functions
ellint_1	computes incomplete elliptic integral of the first kind
ellint_2	computes incomplete elliptic integral of the second kind
ellint_3	computes incomplete elliptic integral of the third kind
expint	computes exponential integral
hermite	computes Hermite polynomials
legendre	computes Legendre polynomials
laguerre	computes Laguerre polynomials
riemann_zeta	computes Riemann zeta function
sph_bessel	computes spherical Bessel functions of the first kind
sph_legendre	computes spherical associated Legendre functions
sph_neumann	computes spherical Neumann functions

== Implementations ==
Under POSIX systems like Linux and BSD, the mathematical functions (as declared in <math.h>) are bundled separately in the mathematical library libm. Therefore, if any of those functions are used, the linker must be given the directive -lm. There are various libm implementations, including:

- GNU libc's libm
- AMD's libm, github, used almost as is by Windows
- Intel C++ Compiler libm
- Red Hat's libm (Newlib)
- Sun's FDLIBM, which was used as the basis for FreeBSD's msun and OpenBSD's libm, both of which in turn were the basis of Julia's OpenLibm
- musl's libm, based on the BSD libms and other projects like Arm
- LLVM's libm, which is correctly rounded (i.e. errors from the mathematically correct result are lower than 0.5 unit in the last place)
- Arénaire project's CRlibm (correctly rounded libm), and its successor MetaLibm, which uses Remez algorithm to automatically generate approximations that are formally proven.
- Rutger's RLIBM, which provides correctly rounded functions in single precision.

Implementations not necessarily under a name of libm include:

- Arm's optimized math routines
- GCE-Math is a version of C/C++ math functions written for C++ constexpr (compile-time calculation)
- CORE-MATH, correctly rounded for single and double precision.
- SIMD (vectorized) math libraries include SLEEF, Yeppp!, and Agner Fog's VCL, plus a few closed-source ones like SVML and DirectXMath. C++ provides SIMD operations in its own standard library in the <simd> header under the std::simd namespace.

== See also ==
- C99 floating-point support
