= C date and time functions =

Library of C programs

The C date and time functions are a group of functions in the standard library of the C programming language implementing date and time manipulation operations. They provide support for time acquisition, conversion between date formats, and formatted output to strings.

== History ==
The format string used in strftime traces back to at least PWB/UNIX 1.0, released in 1977. Its date system command includes various formatting options. In 1989, the ANSI C standard is released including strftime and other date and time functions.

== Overview of functions ==
The C date and time operations are defined in the <time.h> header file (<ctime> header in C++).

	Identifier	Description
Time manipulation	difftime	computes the difference in seconds between two time_t values
Time manipulation	time	returns the current time of the system as a time_t value, number of seconds, (which is usually time since an epoch, typically the Unix epoch). The value of the epoch is operating system dependent; 1900 and 1970 are often used. See RFC 868.
Time manipulation	clock	returns a processor tick count associated with the process
Time manipulation	timespec_get (C11)	returns a calendar time based on a time base
Format conversions	asctime	converts a struct tm object to a textual representation (deprecated)
Format conversions	ctime	converts a time_t value to a textual representation
Format conversions	strftime	converts a struct tm object to custom textual representation
Format conversions	strptime	converts a string with time information to a struct tm
Format conversions	wcsftime	converts a struct tm object to custom wide string textual representation
Format conversions	gmtime	converts a time_t value to calendar time expressed as Coordinated Universal Time
Format conversions	localtime	converts a time_t value to calendar time expressed as local time
Format conversions	mktime	converts calendar time to a time_t value.
Constants	CLOCKS_PER_SEC	number of processor clock ticks per second
Constants	TIME_UTC	time base for UTC
Types	struct tm	broken-down calendar time type: year, month, day, hour, minute, second
Types	time_t	arithmetic time type (typically time since the Unix epoch)
Types	clock_t	process running time type
Types	struct timespec	time with seconds and nanoseconds

The timespec and related types were originally proposed by Markus Kuhn to provide a variety of time bases, but only TIME_UTC was accepted. The functionalities were, however, added to C++ with the release of C++20 in std::chrono.

== Example ==
The following C source code prints the current time to the standard output stream.

#include <stdio.h>
#include <stdlib.h>
#include <time.h>

int main(void) {
    // Obtain current time.
    time_t current_time = time(NULL);

    if (current_time == (time_t)-1) {
        fprintf(stderr, "Failure to obtain the current time.\n");
        return EXIT_FAILURE;
    }

    // Convert to local time format. 
    char* time_string = ctime(&current_time);

    if (!time_string) {
        fprintf(stderr, "Failure to convert the current time.\n");
        return EXIT_FAILURE;
    }

    // Print to stdout. ctime() has already added a terminating newline character.
    printf("Current time is %s", time_string);
    return EXIT_SUCCESS;
}

The output is:

Current time is Thu Sep 15 21:18:23 2016

== See also ==
- Unix time
- Year 2038 problem
