= Comparison of programming languages (basic instructions) =

This article compares a large number of programming languages by tabulating their data types, their expression, statement, and declaration syntax, and some common operating-system interfaces.

== Conventions of this article ==
Generally, var, var, or var is how variable names or other non-literal values to be interpreted by the reader are represented. The rest is literal code. Guillemets (« and ») enclose optional sections. Tab ↹ indicates a necessary (whitespace) indentation.

The tables are not sorted lexicographically ascending by programming language name by default, and that some languages have entries in some tables but not others.

== Type identifiers ==
=== Integers ===
	8 bit (byte)		16 bit (short integer)		32 bit		64 bit (long integer)		Word size		Arbitrarily precise (bignum)
	Signed	Unsigned	Signed	Unsigned	Signed	Unsigned	Signed	Unsigned	Signed	Unsigned	Arbitrarily precise (bignum)
Ada	range -2**7 .. 2**7 - 1^{[j]}	range 0 .. 2**8 - 1^{[j]} or mod 2**8^{[k]}	range -2**15 .. 2**15 - 1^{[j]}	range 0 .. 2**16 - 1^{[j]} or mod 2**16^{[k]}	range -2**31 .. 2**31 - 1^{[j]}	range 0 .. 2**32 - 1^{[j]} or mod 2**32^{[k]}	range -2**63 .. 2**63 - 1^{[j]}	mod 2**64^{[k]}	Integer^{[j]}	range 0 .. 2**Integer'Size - 1^{[j]} or mod Integer'Size^{[k]}	N/A
ALGOL 68 (variable-width)	short short int^{[c]}	N/A	short int^{[c]}	N/A	int^{[c]}	N/A	long int^{[c]}	N/A	int^{[c]}	N/A	long long int^{[a]}^{[g]}
ALGOL 68 (variable-width)	short short int^{[c]}	N/A	short int^{[c]}	N/A	int^{[c]}	N/A	long int^{[c]}	N/A	bytes and bits		long long int^{[a]}^{[g]}
C (C99 fixed-width)	int8_t	uint8_t	int16_t	uint16_t	int32_t	uint32_t	int64_t	uint64_t	intptr_t^{[c]}	size_t^{[c]}	N/A
C++ (C++11 fixed-width)	int8_t	uint8_t	int16_t	uint16_t	int32_t	uint32_t	int64_t	uint64_t	intptr_t^{[c]}	size_t^{[c]}	N/A
C (C99 variable-width)	signed char	unsigned char, byte (C++17)	short^{[c]}	unsigned short^{[c]}	long^{[c]}	unsigned long^{[c]}	long long^{[c]}	unsigned long long^{[c]}	int^{[c]}	unsigned int^{[c]}	N/A
C++ (C++11 variable-width)	signed char	unsigned char, byte (C++17)	short^{[c]}	unsigned short^{[c]}	long^{[c]}	unsigned long^{[c]}	long long^{[c]}	unsigned long long^{[c]}	int^{[c]}	unsigned int^{[c]}	N/A
Objective-C (Cocoa)	signed char or int8_t	unsigned char or uint8_t	short or int16_t	unsigned short or uint16_t	int or int32_t	unsigned int or uint32_t	long long or int64_t	unsigned long long or uint64_t	NSInteger or long	NSUInteger or unsigned long	N/A
C#	sbyte	byte	short	ushort	int	uint	long	ulong	IntPtr	UIntPtr	System.Numerics.BigInteger (.NET 4.0)
Crystal	Int8	UInt8	Int16	UInt16	Int32	UInt32	Int64	UInt64	N/A	N/A	BigInt (requires explicit inclusion)
Java	byte	N/A	short	char^{[b]}	int	N/A	long	N/A	N/A	N/A	java.math.BigInteger
Go	int8	uint8 or byte	int16	uint16	int32	uint32	int64	uint64	int	uint	big.Int
Rust	i8	u8	i16	u16	i32	u32	i64	u64	isize	usize	N/A
Swift	Int8	UInt8	Int16	UInt16	Int32	UInt32	Int64	UInt64	Int	UInt	
D	byte	ubyte	short	ushort	int	uint	long	ulong	N/A	N/A	BigInt
Common Lisp	(signed-byte 8)	(unsigned-byte 8)	(signed-byte 16)	(unsigned-byte 16)	(signed-byte 32)	(unsigned-byte 32)	(signed-byte 64)	(unsigned-byte 64)			bignum
Scheme											
ISLISP											bignum
Pascal (FPC)	shortint	byte	smallint	word	longint	longword	int64	qword	integer	cardinal	N/A
Visual Basic	N/A	Byte	Integer	N/A	Long	N/A	N/A		N/A		N/A
Visual Basic .NET	SByte	Byte	Short	UShort	Integer	UInteger	Long	ULong	N/A		System.Numerics.BigInteger (.NET 4.0)
FreeBasic	Byte or Integer<8>	UByte or UInteger<8>	Short or Integer<16>	UShort or UInteger<16>	Long or Integer<32>	ULong or UInteger<32>	LongInt or Integer<64>	ULongInt or UInteger<64>	Integer	UInteger	N/A
Python 2.x	N/A		N/A		N/A		N/A		int	N/A	long
Python 3.x	N/A		N/A		N/A		N/A		N/A		int
S-Lang	N/A		N/A		N/A		N/A		N/A		N/A
Fortran	INTEGER(KIND = n)^{[f]}	N/A	INTEGER(KIND = n)^{[f]}	N/A	INTEGER(KIND = n)^{[f]}	N/A	INTEGER(KIND = n)^{[f]}	N/A			
PHP	N/A		N/A		int^{[m]}	N/A	int^{[m]}	N/A	N/A		^{[e]}
Perl 5	N/A^{[d]}		N/A^{[d]}		N/A^{[d]}		N/A^{[d]}		N/A^{[d]}		Math::BigInt
Raku	int8	uint8	int16	uint16	int32	uint32	int64	uint64	Int	N/A	
Ruby	N/A		N/A		N/A		N/A		Fixnum	N/A	Bignum
Erlang^{[n]}	N/A		N/A		N/A		N/A		integer()	N/A	integer()^{[o]}
Scala	Byte	N/A	Short	Char^{[l]}	Int	N/A	Long	N/A	N/A	N/A	scala.math.BigInt
Seed7	N/A	N/A	N/A	N/A	N/A	N/A	integer	N/A	N/A	N/A	bigInteger
Smalltalk	N/A		N/A		N/A		N/A		SmallInteger^{[i]}	N/A	LargeInteger^{[i]}
Windows PowerShell	N/A		N/A		N/A		N/A		N/A		N/A
OCaml	N/A		N/A		int32	N/A	int64	N/A	int or nativeint		open Big_int;; or big_int
F#	sbyte	byte	int16	uint16	int32 or int	uint32	int64	uint64	nativeint	unativeint	bigint
Standard ML	N/A	Word8.word	N/A		Int32.int	Word32.word	Int64.int	Word64.word	int	word	LargeInt.int or IntInf.int
Haskell (GHC)	«import Int» or Int8	«import Word» or Word8	«import Int» or Int16	«import Word» or Word16	«import Int» or Int32	«import Word» or Word32	«import Int» or Int64	«import Word» or Word64	Int	«import Word» or Word	Integer
Eiffel	INTEGER_8	NATURAL_8	INTEGER_16	NATURAL_16	INTEGER_32	NATURAL_32	INTEGER_64	NATURAL_64	INTEGER	NATURAL	N/A
COBOL^{[h]}	BINARY-CHAR «SIGNED»	BINARY-CHAR UNSIGNED	BINARY-SHORT «SIGNED»	BINARY-SHORT UNSIGNED	BINARY-LONG «SIGNED»	BINARY-LONG UNSIGNED	BINARY-DOUBLE «SIGNED»	BINARY-DOUBLE UNSIGNED	N/A	N/A	N/A
Mathematica	N/A		N/A		N/A		N/A		N/A		Integer
Wolfram Language	N/A		N/A		N/A		N/A		N/A		Integer

- ^a The standard constants int shorts and int lengths can be used to determine how many shorts and longs can be usefully prefixed to short int and long int. The actual sizes of short int, int, and long int are available as the constants short max int, max int, and long max int etc.
- ^b Commonly used for characters.
- ^c The ALGOL 68, C and C++ languages do not specify the exact width of the integer types short, int, long, and (C99, C++11) long long, so they are implementation-dependent. In C and C++ short, long, and long long types are required to be at least 16, 32, and 64 bits wide, respectively, but can be more. The int type is required to be at least as wide as short and at most as wide as long, and is typically the width of the word size on the processor of the machine (i.e. on a 32-bit machine it is often 32 bits wide; on 64-bit machines it is sometimes 64 bits wide). C99 and C++11 also define the [u]intN_t exact-width types in the stdint.h header. See C syntax#Integral types for more information. In addition the types size_t and ptrdiff_t are defined in relation to the address size to hold unsigned and signed integers sufficiently large to handle array indices and the difference between pointers.
- ^d Perl 5 does not have distinct types. Integers, floating point numbers, strings, etc. are all considered "scalars".
- ^e PHP has two arbitrary-precision libraries. The BCMath library just uses strings as datatype. The GMP library uses an internal "resource" type.
- ^f The value of n is provided by the SELECTED_INT_KIND intrinsic function.
- ^g ALGOL 68G's runtime option --precision "number" can set precision for long long ints to the required "number" significant digits. The standard constants long long int width and long long max int can be used to determine actual precision.
- ^h COBOL allows the specification of a required precision and will automatically select an available type capable of representing the specified precision. "PIC S9999", for example, would require a signed variable of four decimal digits precision. If specified as a binary field, this would select a 16-bit signed type on most platforms.
- ^i Smalltalk automatically chooses an appropriate representation for integral numbers. Typically, two representations are present, one for integers fitting the native word size minus any tag bit (SmallInteger) and one supporting arbitrary sized integers (LargeInteger). Arithmetic operations support polymorphic arguments and return the result in the most appropriate compact representation.
- ^j Ada range types are checked for boundary violations at run-time (as well as at compile-time for static expressions). Run-time boundary violations raise a "constraint error" exception. Ranges are not restricted to powers of two. Commonly predefined Integer subtypes are: Positive (range 1 .. Integer'Last) and Natural (range 0 .. Integer'Last). Short_Short_Integer (8 bits), Short_Integer (16 bits) and Long_Integer (64 bits) are also commonly predefined, but not required by the Ada standard. Runtime checks can be disabled if performance is more important than integrity checks.
- ^k Ada modulo types implement modulo arithmetic in all operations, i.e. no range violations are possible. Modulos are not restricted to powers of two.
- ^l Commonly used for characters like Java's char.
- ^m int in PHP has the same width as long type in C has on that system.^{[c]}
- ^n Erlang is dynamically typed. The type identifiers are usually used to specify types of record fields and the argument and return types of functions.
- ^o When it exceeds one word.

=== Floating point ===
	Single precision	Double precision	Other precision	Processor dependent
Ada	Float	Long_Float	—N/a	
ALGOL 68	real^{[a]}	long real^{[a]}	short real, long long real, etc.^{[d]}	
C	float^{[b]}	double	long double^{[f]}	
C++ (STL)	float^{[b]}	double	long double^{[f]}	
Objective-C (Cocoa)	float^{[b]}	double	long double^{[f]}	CGFloat
C#	float	double	—N/a	
Crystal	Float64	Float64	—N/a	
Java	float	double	—N/a	
Go	float32	float64	—N/a	
Rust	f32	f64	f16, f128	
Swift	Float or Float32	Double or Float64	Float80^{[g]}	CGFloat
D	float	double		real
Common Lisp	single-float	double-float	float, short-float, long-float	
Scheme				
ISLISP				
Pascal (FPC)	single	double		real
Visual Basic	Single	Double	—N/a	
Visual Basic .NET	Single	Double	—N/a	
Xojo	Single	Double	—N/a	
Python	—N/a	float		
JavaScript	—N/a	Number	—N/a	
S-Lang				
Fortran	REAL(KIND = n)^{[c]}			
PHP		float		
Perl				
Raku	num32	num64		Num
Ruby	—N/a	Float	—N/a	
Scala	Float	Double	—N/a	
Seed7	—N/a	float	—N/a	
Smalltalk	Float	Double	—N/a	
Windows PowerShell				
OCaml	—N/a	float	—N/a	
F#	float32	float	—N/a	
Standard ML	—N/a		—N/a	real
Haskell (GHC)	Float	Double		
Eiffel	REAL_32	REAL_64		
COBOL	FLOAT-BINARY-7^{[e]}	FLOAT-BINARY-34^{[e]}	FLOAT-SHORT, FLOAT-LONG, FLOAT-EXTENDED	
Mathematica	—N/a	—N/a		Real

- ^a The standard constants real shorts and real lengths can be used to determine how many shorts and longs can be usefully prefixed to short real and long real. The actual sizes of short real, real, and long real are available as the constants short max real, max real and long max real etc. With the constants short small real, small real and long small real available for each type's machine epsilon.
- ^b declarations of single precision often are not honored
- ^c The value of n is provided by the SELECTED_REAL_KIND intrinsic function.
- ^d ALGOL 68G's runtime option --precision "number" can set precision for long long reals to the required "number" significant digits. The standard constants long long real width and long long max real can be used to determine actual precision.
- ^e These IEEE floating-point types will be introduced in the next COBOL standard.
- ^f Same size as double on many implementations.
- ^g Swift supports 80-bit extended precision floating point type, equivalent to long double in C languages.

=== Complex numbers ===
	Integer	Single precision	Double precision	Half and Quadruple precision etc.
Ada	—N/a	Complex^{[b]}	Complex^{[b]}	Complex^{[b]}
ALGOL 68	—N/a	compl	long compl etc.	short compl etc. and long long compl etc.
C (C99)	—N/a	float complex	double complex	—N/a
C++ (STL)	—N/a	std::complex<float>	std::complex<double>	—N/a
C#	—N/a	—N/a	System.Numerics.Complex (.NET 4.0)	—N/a
Java	—N/a	—N/a	—N/a	—N/a
Go	—N/a	complex64	complex128	—N/a
D	—N/a	cfloat	cdouble	—N/a
Objective-C	—N/a	—N/a	—N/a	—N/a
Common Lisp	(complex integer)	(complex single-float)	(complex double-float)	complex
Scheme				—N/a
Pascal	—N/a	—N/a		—N/a
Visual Basic	—N/a	—N/a		—N/a
Visual Basic .NET	—N/a	—N/a	System.Numerics.Complex (.NET 4.0)	—N/a
Perl			Math::Complex	
Raku		complex64	complex128	Complex
Python			complex	—N/a
JavaScript	—N/a	—N/a		—N/a
S-Lang	—N/a	—N/a		—N/a
Fortran		COMPLEX(KIND = n)^{[a]}		—N/a
Ruby	Complex	—N/a	Complex	—N/a
Scala	—N/a	—N/a	—N/a	—N/a
Seed7	—N/a	—N/a	complex	—N/a
Smalltalk	Complex	Complex	Complex	—N/a
Windows PowerShell	—N/a	—N/a		—N/a
OCaml	—N/a	—N/a	Complex.t	—N/a
F#			System.Numerics.Complex (.NET 4.0)	—N/a
Standard ML	—N/a	—N/a	—N/a	—N/a
Haskell (GHC)	—N/a	Complex.Complex Float	Complex.Complex Double	—N/a
Eiffel	—N/a	—N/a	—N/a	—N/a
COBOL	—N/a	—N/a	—N/a	—N/a
Mathematica	Complex	—N/a	—N/a	Complex

- ^a The value of n is provided by the SELECTED_REAL_KIND intrinsic function.
- ^b Generic type which can be instantiated with any base floating point type.

=== Other variable types ===
	Text		Boolean	Enumeration	Object/Universal
	Character	String^{[a]}	Boolean	Enumeration	Object/Universal
Ada	Character	String, Bounded_String, Unbounded_String	Boolean	(item_{1}, item_{2}, ...)	tagged null record
ALGOL 68	char	string, bytes	bool, bits	N/A - User defined	N/A
C (C99)	char, wchar_t	N/A	bool^{[b]}	enum «name» { item_{1}, item_{2}, ... };	void *
C++ (STL)	char, wchar_t	«std::»string	bool^{[b]}	enum «name» { item_{1}, item_{2}, ... };	void *
Objective-C	unichar	NSString *	BOOL	enum «name» { item_{1}, item_{2}, ... };	id
C#	char	string	bool	enum name { item_{1}« = value», item_{2}« = value», ... }	object
Crystal	Char	String	Bool	enum Name item_{1} item_{2}... end	N/A
Java	char	String	boolean	enum name { item_{1}, item_{2}, ... }	Object
Go	byte, rune	string	bool	const ( item_{1} = iota item_{2}...)	interface{}
Rust	char	String	bool	enum name { item_{1}« = value», item_{2}« = value», ... }	std::any::Any
Swift	Character	String	Bool	enum name { case item_{1}, item_{2}, ... }	Any
D	char	string	bool	enum name { item_{1}, item_{2}, ... }	std.variant.Variant
Common Lisp	character	string	boolean	(member item_{1} item_{2} ...)	t
Scheme					
ISLISP					
Pascal (ISO)	char	N/A	boolean	( item_{1}, item_{2}, ... )	N/A
Object Pascal (Delphi)	char	string	boolean	( item_{1}, item_{2}, ... )	variant
Visual Basic	N/A	String	Boolean	Enum name item_{1} «= value» item_{2} «= value»... End Enum	Variant
Visual Basic .NET	Char	String	Boolean	Enum name item_{1} «= value» item_{2} «= value»... End Enum	Object
Xojo	N/A	String	Boolean	Enum name item_{1} «= value» item_{2} «= value»... End Enum	Object or Variant
Python	N/A^{[d]}	str	bool	from enum import Enum class Name(Enum):     item1 = value     item2 = value     ...	object
JavaScript	N/A^{[d]}	String	Boolean		Object
S-Lang					
Fortran	CHARACTER(LEN = *)	CHARACTER(LEN = :), allocatable	LOGICAL(KIND = n)^{[f]}		CLASS(*)
PHP	N/A^{[d]}	string	bool		(type declaration omitted)
Perl	N/A^{[d]}				UNIVERSAL
Raku	Char	Str	Bool	enum name<item_{1} item_{2} ...> enum name «:item_{1}(value) :item_{2}(value) ..»	Mu
Ruby	N/A^{[d]}	String	Object^{[c]}		Object
Scala	Char	String	Boolean	object name extends Enumeration { val item_{1}, item_{2}, ... = Value }	Any
Seed7	char	string	boolean	const type: name is new enum item_{1}, item_{2},... end enum;	
Windows PowerShell					
OCaml	char	string	bool	N/A^{[e]}	N/A
F#	char	string	bool	type name = item_{1} = value |item_{2} = value | ...	obj
Standard ML	char	string	bool	N/A^{[e]}	N/A
Haskell (GHC)	Char	String	Bool	N/A^{[e]}	N/A
Eiffel	CHARACTER	STRING	BOOLEAN	N/A	ANY
COBOL	PIC X	PIC X(string length) or PIC X«X...»	PIC 1«(number of digits)» or PIC 1«1...»	N/A	OBJECT REFERENCE
Mathematica	N/A^{[d]}	String			N/A

- ^a specifically, strings of arbitrary length and automatically managed.
- ^b This language represents a boolean as an integer where false is represented as a value of zero and true by a non-zero value.
- ^c All values evaluate to either true or false. Everything in TrueClass evaluates to true and everything in FalseClass evaluates to false.
- ^dThis language does not have a separate character type. Characters are represented as strings of length 1.
- ^e Enumerations in this language are algebraic types with only nullary constructors
- ^f The value of n is provided by the SELECTED_INT_KIND intrinsic function.

== Derived types ==
=== Array ===
	fixed size array		dynamic size array	
	one-dimensional array	multidimensional array	one-dimensional array	multidimensional array
Ada	array (<first> .. <last>) of <type> or array (<discrete_type>) of <type>	array (<first_{1}> .. <last_{1}>, <first_{2}> .. <last_{2}>, ...) of <type> or array (<discrete_type_{1}>, <discrete_type_{2}>, ...) of <type>	array (<discrete_type> range <>) of <type>	array (<discrete_type_{1}> range <>, <discrete_type_{2}> range <>, ...) of <type>
ALGOL 68	[first:last]«modename» or simply: [size]«modename»	[first_{1}:last_{1}, first_{2}:last_{2}]«modename» or [first_{1}:last_{1}][first_{2}:last_{2}]«modename» etc.	flex[first:last]«modename» or simply: flex[size]«modename»	flex[first_{1}:last_{1}, first_{2}:last_{2}]«modename» or flex[first_{1}:last_{1}]flex[first_{2}:last_{2}]«modename» etc.
C (C99)	type name[size]^{[a]}	type name[size_{1}][size_{2}]^{[a]}	type *name or within a block: int n = ...; type name[n]	
C++ (STL)	«std::»array<type, size>(C++11)		«std::»vector<type>	
C#	type[]	type[,,...]	System.Collections.ArrayList or System.Collections.Generic.List<type>	
Crystal	Array(type[s]).new(size)^{[b]}		Array(type[s]).new	
Java	type[]^{[c]}	type[][]...^{[c]}	ArrayList or ArrayList<type>	
D	type[size]	type[size_{1}][size_{2}]	type[]	
Go	[size]type	[size_{1}][size_{2}]...type	[]type	[][]type
Rust	[type; size]	[[type; size_{1}]; size_{2}]	Vec<type>	Vec<Vec<type>>
Swift			[type] or Array<type>	[[type]] or Array<Array<type>>
Objective-C	NSArray		NSMutableArray	
JavaScript	—N/a	—N/a	Array^{[d]}	
Common Lisp	(simple-array type (dimension))	(simple-array type (dimension1 dimension2))	(array type (dimension))	(array type (dimension1 dimension2))
Scheme				
ISLISP				
Pascal	array[first..last] of type^{[e]}	array[first_{1}..last_{1}] of array[first_{2}..last_{2}] ... of type^{[e]} or array[first_{1}..last_{1}, first_{2}..last_{2}, ...] of type^{[e]}	—N/a	—N/a
Object Pascal (Delphi)	array[first..last] of type^{[e]}	array[first_{1}..last_{1}] of array[first_{2}..last_{2}] ... of type^{[e]} or array[first_{1}..last_{1}, first_{2}..last_{2}, ...] of type^{[e]}	array of type	array of array ... of type
Visual Basic	Dim x(last) As type	Dim x(last_{1}, last_{2},...) As type		
Visual Basic .NET	type()	type(,,...)	System.Collections.ArrayList or System.Collections.Generic.List(Of type)	
Python			list	
S-Lang	x = type[size];	x = type[size_{1}, size_{2}, ...];		
Fortran	type :: name(size)	type :: name(size_{1}, size_{2},...)	type, ALLOCATABLE :: name(:)	type, ALLOCATABLE :: name(:,:,...)
PHP			array	
Perl				
Raku			Array[type] or Array of type	
Ruby		x = Array.new(size_{1}){ Array.new(size_{2}) }	Array	
Scala	Array[type]	Array[...[Array[type]]...]	ArrayBuffer[type]	
Seed7	array type or array [idxType] type	array array type or array [idxType] array [idxType] type	array type or array [idxType] type	array array type or array [idxType] array [idxType] type
Smalltalk	Array		OrderedCollection	
Windows PowerShell	type[]	type[,,...]		
OCaml	type array	type array ... array		
F#	type [] or type array	type [,,...]	System.Collections.ArrayList or System.Collections.Generic.List<type>	
Standard ML	type vector or type array			
Haskell (GHC)	x = Array.array (0, size-1) list_of_association_pairs	x = Array.array ((0, 0,...), (size_{1}-1, size_{2}-1,...)) list_of_association_pairs		
COBOL	level-number type OCCURS size «TIMES».	one-dimensional array definition...	level-number type OCCURS min-size TO max-size «TIMES» DEPENDING «ON» size.^{[f]}	—N/a

- ^aIn most expressions (except the sizeof and & operators), values of array types in C are automatically converted to a pointer of its first argument. See C syntax#Arrays for further details of syntax and pointer operations.
- ^bBecause all types in Crystal are objects, an Array can inherently contain other Arrays by specifying so in a literal or type declaration (e.g., Array(Array(Int32 | Float64)) specifies a two-dimensional array containing 32-bit integers and double-precision floating-point numbers).
- ^c The C-like type x[] works in Java, however type[] x is the preferred form of array declaration.
- ^d Subranges are used to define the bounds of the array.
- ^e JavaScript's array are a special kind of object.
- ^f The DEPENDING ON clause in COBOL does not create a true variable length array and will always allocate the maximum size of the array.

=== Other types ===
	Simple composite types		Algebraic data types	Unions
	Records	Tuple expression	Algebraic data types	Unions
Ada	type name is «abstract» «tagged» «limited» [record field_{1} : type; field_{2} : type;... end record | null record]	N/A	Any combination of records, unions, and enumerations (as well as references to those, enabling recursive types).	type name (variation : discrete_type) is record case variation is when choice_list_{1} => fieldname_{1} : type;... when choice_list_{2} => fieldname_{2} : type;...... end case; end record
ALGOL 68	struct (modename «fieldname», ...);	Required types and operators can be user-defined		union (modename, ...);
C (C99)	struct «name» {type name;...};	N/A	N/A	union {type name;...};
Objective-C	struct «name» {type name;...};	N/A	N/A	union {type name;...};
C++	struct «name» {type name;...};^{[b]}	«std::»tuple<type_{1}..type_{n}>	N/A	union {type name;...};
C#	struct name {type name;...}	(val_{1}, val_{2}, ... )		N/A
Crystal	class Name def initialize(name : type) @name = name end end	{val_{1}, val_{2}, ...}	classes and structs can be used to define any combination of types and any operation on them through their methods.	N/A
Java	N/A^{[a]}			N/A
JavaScript		N/A		
D	struct name {type name;...}		std.variant.Algebraic!(type,...)	union {type name;...}
Go	struct { «name» type... }			
Rust	struct name {name: type, ...}	(val_{1}, val_{2}, ... )	enum name { Foo(types), ...}	union name {name: type, ...}
Swift	struct name { var name «: type»... }	(«name_{1}:» val_{1}, «name_{2}:» val_{2}, «name_{3}:» val_{3}, ... )	enum name { case Foo«(types)» case Bar «(types)» ... }	
Common Lisp	(defstruct name slot-name (slot-name initial-value) (slot-name initial-value :type type) ...)	(cons val_{1} val_{2})^{[c]}		
Scheme	N/A	(cons val_{1} val_{2})^{[c]}		
ISLISP		(cons val_{1} val_{2})^{[c]}		
Pascal	record name: type;... end	N/A	N/A	record case type of value: (types);... end
Visual Basic				
Visual Basic .NET	Structure name Dim name As type... End Structure	(val_{1}, val_{2}, ... )		
Python	N/A^{[a]}	«(»val_{1}, val_{2}, val_{3}, ... «)»		N/A
S-Lang	struct {name [=value], ...}			
Fortran	TYPE name type :: name... END TYPE			
PHP	N/A^{[a]}			
Perl	N/A^{[d]}			N/A
Raku	N/A^{[a]}			N/A
Ruby	OpenStruct.new({:name => value})			N/A
Scala	case class name(«var» name: type, ...)	(val_{1}, val_{2}, val_{3}, ... )	abstract class name case class Foo(«parameters») extends name case class Bar(«parameters») extends name... or abstract class name case object Foo extends name case object Bar extends name... or a combination of case classes and case objects	
Windows PowerShell				
OCaml	type name = {«mutable» name : type;...}	«(»val_{1}, val_{2}, val_{3}, ... «)»	type name = Foo «of type» | Bar «of type» | ...	N/A
F#	type name = {«mutable» name : type;...}	«(»val_{1}, val_{2}, val_{3}, ... «)»	type name = Foo «of type» | Bar «of type» | ...	N/A
Standard ML	type name = {name : type,...}	(val_{1}, val_{2}, val_{3}, ... )	datatype name = Foo «of type» | Bar «of type» | ...	N/A
Haskell	data Name = Constr {name :: type,...}	(val_{1}, val_{2}, val_{3}, ... )	data Name = Foo «types» | Bar «types» | ...	N/A
COBOL	level-number name type clauses. level-number+n name type clauses....	N/A	N/A	name REDEFINES variable type.

- ^a Only classes are supported.
- ^b structs in C++ are actually classes, but have default public visibility and are also POD objects. C++11 extended this further, to make classes act identically to POD objects in many more cases.
- ^c pair only
- ^d Although Perl doesn't have records, because Perl's type system allows different data types to be in an array, "hashes" (associative arrays) that don't have a variable index would effectively be the same as records.
- ^e Enumerations in this language are algebraic types with only nullary constructors

== Variable and constant declarations ==
	variable	constant	type synonym
Ada	identifier : type« := initial_value»^{[e]}	identifier : constant type := final_value	subtype identifier is type
ALGOL 68	modename name« := initial_value»;	modename name = value;	mode synonym = modename;
C (C99)	type name« = initial_value»;	enum{ name = value };	typedef type synonym;
Objective-C	type name« = initial_value»;	enum{ name = value };	typedef type synonym;
C++	type name« = initial_value»;	const type name = value;	typedef type synonym;
C#	type name_{1}« = initial_value», name_{2}« = initial_value», ...; or var name = initial_value;	const type name = value, name = value, ...; or readonly type name = value, name = value, ... ;	using synonym = type;
Crystal	name : type = initial_value or name = initial_value	NAME = value	alias synonym = type
D	type name« = initial_value»; or auto name = value;	const type name = value; or immutable type name = value;	alias type synonym;
Java	type name« = initial_value»;	final type name = value;	—N/a
JavaScript	var name« = initial_value»; or let name« = initial_value»; (since ECMAScript 2015)	const name = value; (since ECMAScript 2015)	—N/a
Go	var name type« = initial_value» or name := initial_value	const name «type» = value	type synonym type
Racket	(define name expression)		
Rust^{[f]}	let mut name«: type»« = initial_value»; static mut NAME: type = value;	let name«: type»« = initial_value»; const NAME: type = value; static NAME: type = value;	type synonym = typename;
Swift	var name «: type»« = initial_value»	let name «: type» = value	typealias synonym = type
Common Lisp	(defparameter name initial-value) or (defvar name initial-value)	(defconstant name value)	(deftype synonym () 'type)
Scheme	(define name initial_value)		
ISLISP	(defglobal name initial_value) or (defdynamic name initial_value)	(defconstant name value)	—N/a
Pascal^{[a]}	name: type« = initial_value»	name = value	synonym = type
Visual Basic	Dim name «As type»	See notes to left. Constants use the same syntax, and: use Const instead of Dim; have a restriction to only certain primitive types Const name_{1} «As type» = value, name_{2} «As type» = value, ...	
Visual Basic .NET	The variable declaration syntax of VB.NET is unusually difficult to precisely describe. Given that there exist the identifier suffixes ("modifiers"): type_character, available as an alternative to an As clause for some primitive data types; nullable_specifier; and; array_specifier; and that: a modified_identifier is of the form identifier«type_character»«nullable_specifier»«array_specifier»; a modified_identifier_list is a comma-separated list of two or more occurrences of modified_identifier; and; a declarator_list is a comma-separated list of declarators, which can be of the form; identifier As object_creation_expression (object initializer declarator), modified_identifier «As non_array_type«array_rank_specifier»»« = initial_value» (single declarator), or; modified_identifier_list «As «non_array_type««array_rank_specifier»» (multiple declarator); valid declaration statements are of the form Dim declarator_list, where, for the purpose of semantic analysis, to convert the declarator_list to a list of only single declarators: The As clauses of each multiple declarator is distributed over its modified_identifier_list; The As New type... of each object initializer declarator is replaced with As type = New type...; and for which, for each identifier, a type_character and As clause do not both appear; if an As clause is present, an array_rank_specifier does not appear both as a modification of the identifier and on the type of the As clause; an unmodified_type can be determined, by the rule that, if a type_character or As clause is present, unmodified_type is that specified by such construct, and that otherwise, either Option Infer must be on and the identifier must have an initializer, in which case unmodified_type is that of the initializer, or; Option Strict must be off, in which case unmodified_type is Object; its final_type is its unmodified_type prepended before its modifiers; its final_type is a valid type; and; if an initial_value is present, either Option Strict is on and initial_value has a widening conversion to final_type, or; Option Strict is off and initial_value has a narrowing conversion to final_type.; If Option Explicit is off, variables do not require explicit declaration; they are declared implicitly when used: name = initial_value	See notes to left. Constants use the same syntax, and: use Const instead of Dim; have a restriction to only certain primitive types Const name_{1} «As type» = value, name_{2} «As type» = value, ...	Imports synonym = type
Xojo	Dim name «As type»« = initial_value»	See notes to left. Constants use the same syntax, and: use Const instead of Dim; have a restriction to only certain primitive types Const name_{1} «As type» = value, name_{2} «As type» = value, ...	—N/a
Python	name«: type» = initial_value	—N/a	synonym = type^{[b]}
CoffeeScript	name = initial_value	—N/a	
S-Lang	name = initial_value;		typedef struct {...} typename
Fortran	type :: name	type, PARAMETER :: name = value	
PHP	$name = initial_value;	define("name", value); const name = value (5.3+)	—N/a
Perl	«my» $name« = initial_value»;^{[c]}	use constant name => value;	—N/a
Raku	«my «type»» $name« = initial_value»;^{[c]}	«my «type»» constant name = value;	::synonym ::= type
Ruby	name = initial_value	Name = value	synonym = type^{[b]}
Scala	var name«: type» = initial_value	val name«: type» = value	type synonym = type
Windows PowerShell	«[type]» $name = initial_value	—N/a	—N/a
Bash shell	name=initial_value	—N/a	—N/a
OCaml	let name« : type ref» = ref value^{[d]}	let name «: type» = value	type synonym = type
F#	let mutable name «: type» = value	let name «: type» = value	type synonym = type
Standard ML	val name «: type ref» = ref value^{[d]}	val name «: type» = value	type synonym = type
Haskell		«name::type;» name = value	type Synonym = type
Forth	VARIABLE name (in some systems use value VARIABLE name instead)	value CONSTANT name	
COBOL	level-number name type clauses.	«0»1 name CONSTANT «AS» value.	level-number name type clauses «IS» TYPEDEF.
Mathematica	name=initial_value	—N/a	—N/a

- ^a Pascal has declaration blocks. See functions.
- ^bTypes are just regular objects, so you can just assign them.
- ^c In Perl, the "my" keyword scopes the variable into the block.
- ^d Technically, this does not declare name to be a mutable variable—in ML, all names can only be bound once; rather, it declares name to point to a "reference" data structure, which is a simple mutable cell. The data structure can then be read and written to using the ! and := operators, respectively.
- ^e If no initial value is given, an invalid value is automatically assigned (which will trigger a run-time exception if it used before a valid value has been assigned). While this behaviour can be suppressed it is recommended in the interest of predictability. If no invalid value can be found for a type (for example in case of an unconstraint integer type), a valid, yet predictable value is chosen instead.
- ^f In Rust, if no initial value is given to a let or let mut variable and it is never assigned to later, there is an "unused variable" warning. If no value is provided for a const or static or static mut variable, there is an error. There is a "non-upper-case globals" error for non-uppercase const variables. After it is defined, a static mut variable can only be assigned to in an unsafe block or function.

== Control flow ==
=== Conditional statements ===
	if	else if	select case	conditional expression
Ada	if condition then statements «else statements» end if	if condition_{1} then statements elsif condition_{2} then statements... «else statements» end if	case expression is when value_list_{1} => statements when value_list_{2} => statements... «when others => statements» end case	(if condition_{1} then expression_{1} «elsif condition_{2} then expression_{2}»... else expression_{n}) or (case expression is when value_list_{1} => expression_{1} when value_list_{2} => expression_{2}... «when others => expression_{n}»)
Seed7	if condition then statements «else statements» end if	if condition_{1} then statements elsif condition_{2} then statements... «else statements» end if	case expression of when set1 : statements... «otherwise: statements» end case	
Modula-2	if condition then statements «else statements» end	if condition_{1} then statements elsif condition_{2} then statements... «else statements» end	case expression of caseLabelList : statements |... «else statements» end	
ALGOL 68	if condition then statements «else statements» fi	if condition then statements elif condition then statements fi	case switch in statements, statements«,... out statements» esac	( condition | valueIfTrue | valueIfFalse )
ALGOL 68 (brief form)	( condition | statements «| statements» )	( condition | statements |: condition | statements )	( variable | statements,... «| statements» )	
APL	:If condition instructions «:Else instructions» :EndIf	:If condition instructions :ElseIf condition instructions... «:Else instructions» :EndIf	:Select expression :Case case1 instructions... «:Else instructions» :EndSelect	{condition:valueIfTrue ⋄ valueIfFalse}
C (C99)	if (condition) instructions «else instructions» instructions can be a single statement or a block in the form of: { statements }	if (condition) instructions else if (condition) instructions... «else instructions» or if (condition) instructions else { if (condition) instructions }	switch (variable) { case case1: instructions «; break;»... «default: instructions» }	condition ? valueIfTrue : valueIfFalse
Objective-C	if (condition) instructions «else instructions» instructions can be a single statement or a block in the form of: { statements }	if (condition) instructions else if (condition) instructions... «else instructions» or if (condition) instructions else { if (condition) instructions }	switch (variable) { case case1: instructions «; break;»... «default: instructions» }	condition ? valueIfTrue : valueIfFalse
C++ (STL)	if (condition) instructions «else instructions» instructions can be a single statement or a block in the form of: { statements }	if (condition) instructions else if (condition) instructions... «else instructions» or if (condition) instructions else { if (condition) instructions }	switch (variable) { case case1: instructions «; break;»... «default: instructions» }	condition ? valueIfTrue : valueIfFalse
D	if (condition) instructions «else instructions» instructions can be a single statement or a block in the form of: { statements }	if (condition) instructions else if (condition) instructions... «else instructions» or if (condition) instructions else { if (condition) instructions }	switch (variable) { case case1: instructions «; break;»... «default: instructions» }	condition ? valueIfTrue : valueIfFalse
Java	if (condition) instructions «else instructions» instructions can be a single statement or a block in the form of: { statements }	if (condition) instructions else if (condition) instructions... «else instructions» or if (condition) instructions else { if (condition) instructions }	switch (variable) { case case1: instructions «; break;»... «default: instructions» }	condition ? valueIfTrue : valueIfFalse
JavaScript	if (condition) instructions «else instructions» instructions can be a single statement or a block in the form of: { statements }	if (condition) instructions else if (condition) instructions... «else instructions» or if (condition) instructions else { if (condition) instructions }	switch (variable) { case case1: instructions «; break;»... «default: instructions» }	condition ? valueIfTrue : valueIfFalse
PHP	if (condition) instructions «else instructions» instructions can be a single statement or a block in the form of: { statements }	if (condition) instructions else if (condition) instructions... «else instructions» or if (condition) instructions else { if (condition) instructions }	switch (variable) { case case1: instructions «; break;»... «default: instructions» }	condition ? valueIfTrue : valueIfFalse
C#	if (condition) instructions «else instructions» instructions can be a single statement or a block in the form of: { statements }	if (condition) instructions else if (condition) instructions... «else instructions»	switch (variable) { case case_{1}: instructions «break_or_jump_statement»... «default: instructions break_or_jump_statement» } All non-empty cases must end with a break or goto case statement (that is, they are not allowed to fall-through to the next case). The default case is not required to come last.	condition ? valueIfTrue : valueIfFalse
Crystal	if condition statements else statements end	if condition_{1} statements elsif condition_{2} statements... else statements end	case value when case_{1} instructionswhen case_{2} instructions ...else instructions end	condition ? true_val : false_val
Windows PowerShell	if (condition) instruction «else instructions»	if (condition) { instructions } elseif (condition) { instructions }... «else { instructions }»	switch (variable) { case1{instructions «break;» } ... «default { instructions }»}	
Go	if condition {instructions} «else {instructions}»	if condition {instructions} else if condition {instructions}... «else {instructions}» or switch { case condition: instructions... «default: instructions» }	switch variable { case case_{1}: instructions... «default: instructions» }	
Swift	if condition {instructions} «else {instructions}»	if condition {instructions} else if condition {instructions}... «else {instructions}»	switch variable { case case_{1}: instructions... «default: instructions» }	
Perl	if (condition) {instructions} «else {instructions}» or unless (notcondition) {instructions} «else {instructions}»	if (condition) {instructions} elsif (condition) {instructions}... «else {instructions}» or unless (notcondition) {instructions} elsif (condition) {instructions}... «else {instructions}»	use feature "switch";... given (variable) { when (case_{1}) { instructions }... «default { instructions }» }	condition ? valueIfTrue : valueIfFalse
Racket	(when testexpression expressions) or (unless condition expressions)	(cond [testexpression expressions] [testexpression expressions]... [else expressions])	(case expression [(case1) expressions] [(case2) expressions]... [else expressions])	(if testexpression expressioniftrue expressioniffalse)
Raku	if condition {instructions} «else {instructions}» or unless notcondition {instructions}	if condition {instructions} elsif condition {instructions}... «else {instructions}	given variable { when case_{1} { instructions }... «default { instructions }» }	condition ?? valueIfTrue !! valueIfFalse
Ruby	if condition instructions «else instructions»	if condition instructions elsif condition instructions... «else instructions» end	case variable when case_{1} instructions... «else instructions» end	condition ? valueIfTrue : valueIfFalse
Scala	if (condition) {instructions} «else {instructions}»	if (condition) {instructions} else if (condition) {instructions}... «else {instructions}»	expression match { case pattern1 => expression case pattern2 => expression... «case _ => expression» }^{[b]}	if (condition) valueIfTrue else valueIfFalse
Smalltalk	condition ifTrue: trueBlock «ifFalse: falseBlock» end			condition ifTrue: trueBlock ifFalse: falseBlock
Common Lisp	(when condition instructions) or (unless condition instructions) or (if condition (progn instructions) «(progn instructions)»)	(cond (condition1 instructions) (condition2 instructions)... «(t instructions)»)	(case expression (case1 instructions) (case2 instructions)... «(otherwise instructions)»)	(if test then else) or (cond (test1 value1) (test2 value2) ...))
Scheme	(when condition instructions) or (if condition (begin instructions) «(begin instructions)»)	(cond (condition1 instructions) (condition2 instructions) ... «(else instructions)»)	(case (variable) ((case1) instructions) ((case2) instructions) ... «(else instructions)»)	(if condition valueIfTrue valueIfFalse)
ISLISP	(if condition (progn instructions) «(progn instructions)»)	(cond (condition1 instructions) (condition2 instructions)... «(t instructions)»)	(case expression (case1 instructions) (case2 instructions)... «(t instructions)»)	(if condition valueIfTrue valueIfFalse)
Pascal	if condition then begin instructions end «else begin instructions end»'^{[c]}	if condition then begin instructions end else if condition then begin instructions end... «else begin instructions end»^{[c]}	case variable of case1: instructions... «else: instructions» end^{[c]}	
Visual Basic	If condition Then instructions «Else instructions» End If; Single-line, when instructions are instruction_{1} : instruction_{2} : ...: If condition Then instructions «Else instructions»	If condition Then instructions ElseIf condition Then instructions... «Else instructions» End If; Single-line: See note about C-like languages; the Else clause of a single-line If statement can contain another single-line If statement.	Select« Case» variable Case case_pattern_{1} instructions... «Case Else instructions» End Select	IIf(condition, valueIfTrue, valueIfFalse)
Visual Basic .NET	If condition Then instructions «Else instructions» End If; Single-line, when instructions are instruction_{1} : instruction_{2} : ...: If condition Then instructions «Else instructions»	If condition Then instructions ElseIf condition Then instructions... «Else instructions» End If; Single-line: See note about C-like languages; the Else clause of a single-line If statement can contain another single-line If statement.	Select« Case» variable Case case_pattern_{1} instructions... «Case Else instructions» End Select	If(condition, valueIfTrue, valueIfFalse)
Xojo	If condition Then instructions «Else instructions» End If; Single-line, when instructions are instruction_{1} : instruction_{2} : ...: If condition Then instructions «Else instructions»	If condition Then instructions ElseIf condition Then instructions... «Else instructions» End If; Single-line: See note about C-like languages; the Else clause of a single-line If statement can contain another single-line If statement.	Select« Case» variable Case case_pattern_{1} instructions... «Case Else instructions» End Select	If(condition, valueIfTrue, valueIfFalse)
Python^{[a]}	if condition : Tab ↹instructions «else: Tab ↹instructions»	if condition : Tab ↹instructions elif condition : Tab ↹instructions... «else: Tab ↹instructions»	Python 3.10+: match variable: Tab ↹case case1: Tab ↹Tab ↹instructions Tab ↹case case2: Tab ↹Tab ↹instructions	Python 2.5+: valueIfTrue if condition else valueIfFalse
S-Lang	if (condition) { instructions } «else { instructions }»	if (condition) { instructions } else if (condition) { instructions } ... «else { instructions }»	switch (variable) { case case1: instructions } { case case2: instructions } ...	
Fortran	IF (condition) THEN instructions ELSE instructions ENDIF	IF (condition) THEN instructions ELSEIF (condition) THEN instructions... ELSE instructions ENDIF	SELECT CASE(variable); CASE (case1) instructions... CASE DEFAULT instructions END SELECT	
Forth	condition IF instructions « ELSE instructions» THEN	condition IF instructions ELSE condition IF instructions THEN THEN	value CASE case OF instructions ENDOF case OF instructions ENDOF default instructions ENDCASE	condition IF valueIfTrue ELSE valueIfFalse THEN
OCaml	if condition then begin instructions end «else begin instructions end»	if condition then begin instructions end else if condition then begin instructions end ... «else begin instructions end»	match value with pattern1 -> expression | pattern2 -> expression... «| _ -> expression»^{[b]}	if condition then valueIfTrue else valueIfFalse
F#	Lightweight syntax mode: Either on a single line or with indentation as shown below: if condition then Tab ↹instructions «else Tab ↹instructions» Verbose syntax mode: Same as Standard ML.	Lightweight syntax mode: Either on a single line or with indentation as shown below: if condition then Tab ↹instructions elif condition then Tab ↹instructions... «else Tab ↹instructions» Verbose syntax mode: Same as Standard ML.	match value with pattern1 -> expression | pattern2 -> expression... «| _ -> expression»^{[b]}	if condition then valueIfTrue else valueIfFalse
Standard ML	if condition then «(»instructions «)» else «(» instructions «)»	if condition then «(»instructions «)» else if condition then «(» instructions «)»... else «(» instructions «)»	case value of pattern1 => expression | pattern2 => expression... «| _ => expression»^{[b]}	if condition then valueIfTrue else valueIfFalse
Haskell (GHC)	if condition then expression else expression or when condition (do instructions) or unless notcondition (do instructions)	result | condition = expression | condition = expression | otherwise = expression	case value of { pattern1 -> expression; pattern2 -> expression;... «_ -> expression» }^{[b]}	if condition then valueIfTrue else valueIfFalse
Bash shell	if condition-command; then expression «else expression» fi	if condition-command; then expression elif condition-command; then expression «else expression» fi	case "$variable" in "$condition1" ) command... "$condition2" ) command... esac	
CoffeeScript	if condition then expression «else expression» or if condition expression «else expression» or expression if condition or unless condition expression «else expression» or expression unless condition	if condition then expression else if condition then expression «else expression» or if condition expression else if condition expression «else expression» or unless condition expression else unless condition expression «else expression»	switch expression when condition then expression else expression or switch expression when condition expression «else expression»	All conditions are expressions.
COBOL	IF condition «THEN» expression «ELSE expression».^{[d]}		EVALUATE expression «ALSO expression...» WHEN case-or-condition «ALSO case-or-condition...» expression... «WHEN OTHER expression» END-EVALUATE	
Rust	if condition { expression }« else { expression }»	if condition { expression } else if condition { expression }« else { expression }»	match variable { pattern1 => expression, pattern2 => expression, pattern3 => expression, «_ => expression» }^{[b]}^{[e]}	All conditions are expressions
	if	else if	select case	conditional expression

- ^a A single instruction can be written on the same line following the colon. Multiple instructions are grouped together in a block which starts on a newline (The indentation is required). The conditional expression syntax does not follow this rule.
- ^b This is pattern matching and is similar to select case but not the same. It is usually used to deconstruct algebraic data types.
- ^c In languages of the Pascal family, the semicolon is not part of the statement. It is a separator between statements, not a terminator.
- ^d END-IF may be used instead of the period at the end.
- ^e In Rust, the comma (,) at the end of a match arm can be omitted after the last match arm, or after any match arm in which the expression is a block (ends in possibly empty matching brackets {}).

=== Loop statements ===
	while loop	do while loop	(count-controlled) for loop	foreach
Ada	while condition loop statements end loop	loop statements exit when not condition end loop	for index in «reverse» [first .. last | discrete_type] loop statements end loop	for item of «reverse» iterator loop statements end loop or (for [all | some] [in | of] [first .. last | discrete_type | iterator] => predicate)^{[b]}
ALGOL 68	«for index» «from first» «by increment» «to last» «while condition» do statements od			for key «to upb list» do «typename val=list[key];» statements od
ALGOL 68	«while condition» do statements od	«while statements; condition» do statements od	«for index» «from first» «by increment» «to last» do statements od	for key «to upb list» do «typename val=list[key];» statements od
APL	:While condition statements :EndWhile	:Repeat statements :Until condition	:For var«s» :In list statements :EndFor	:For var«s» :InEach list statements :EndFor
C (C99)	instructions can be a single statement or a block in the form of: { statements } while (condition) instructions	do instructions while (condition);	for («type» i = first; i <= last; i++) instructions	—N/a
Objective-C	instructions can be a single statement or a block in the form of: { statements } while (condition) instructions	do instructions while (condition);	for («type» i = first; i <= last; i++) instructions	for (type item in set) instructions
C++ (STL)	instructions can be a single statement or a block in the form of: { statements } while (condition) instructions	do instructions while (condition);	for («type» i = first; i <= last; i++) instructions	«std::»for_each(start, end, function); Since C++11: for (type item : set) instructions
C#	instructions can be a single statement or a block in the form of: { statements } while (condition) instructions	do instructions while (condition);	for («type» i = first; i <= last; i++) instructions	foreach (type item in set) instructions
Java	instructions can be a single statement or a block in the form of: { statements } while (condition) instructions	do instructions while (condition);	for («type» i = first; i <= last; i++) instructions	for (type item : set) instructions
JavaScript	instructions can be a single statement or a block in the form of: { statements } while (condition) instructions	do instructions while (condition);	for (var i = first; i <= last; i++) instructions	Since EcmaScript 2015: for (var item of set) instructions
PHP	instructions can be a single statement or a block in the form of: { statements } while (condition) instructions	do instructions while (condition);	foreach (range(first, last) as $i) instructions or for ($i = first; $i <= last; $i++) instructions	foreach (set as item) instructions or foreach (set as key => item) instructions
Windows PowerShell	instructions can be a single statement or a block in the form of: { statements } while (condition) instructions	do instructions while (condition);	for ($i = first; $i -le last; $i++) instructions	foreach (item in set) instructions
D	instructions can be a single statement or a block in the form of: { statements } while (condition) instructions	do instructions while (condition);	foreach (i; first ... last) instructions	foreach («type» item; set) instructions
Go	for condition { instructions }		for i := first; i <= last; i++ { instructions }	for key, item := range set { instructions }
Swift	while condition { instructions }	2.x: repeat { instructions } while condition 1.x: do { instructions } while condition	for i = first ... last { instructions } or for i = first ..< last+1 { instructions } or for var i = first; i <= last; i++ { instructions }	for item in set { instructions }
Perl	while (condition) { instructions } or until (notcondition) { instructions }	do { instructions } while (condition) or do { instructions } until (notcondition)	for«each» «$i» (first .. last) { instructions } or for ($i = first; $i <= last; $i++) { instructions }	for«each» «$item» (set) { instructions }
Raku	while condition { instructions } or until notcondition { instructions }	repeat { instructions } while condition or repeat { instructions } until notcondition	for first..last -> $i { instructions } or loop ($i = first; $i <=last; $i++) { instructions }	for set« -> $item» { instructions }
Ruby	while condition instructions end or until notcondition instructions end	begin instructions end while condition or begin instructions end until notcondition	for i in first..last instructions end or for i in first...last+1 instructions end or first.upto(last) { |i| instructions }	for item in set instructions end or set.each { |item| instructions }
Bash shell	while condition ;do instructions done or until notcondition ;do instructions done	—N/a	for ((i = first; i <= last; ++i)) ; do instructions done	for item in set ;do instructions done
Scala	while (condition) { instructions }	do { instructions } while (condition)	for (i <- first to last «by 1») { instructions } or first to last «by 1» foreach (i => { instructions })	for (item <- set) { instructions } or set foreach (item => { instructions })
Smalltalk	conditionBlock whileTrue: loopBlock	loopBlock doWhile: conditionBlock	first to: last do: loopBlock	collection do: loopBlock
Common Lisp	(loop while condition do instructions) or (do () (notcondition) instructions)	(loop do instructions while condition)	(loop for i from first to last «by 1» do instructions) or (dotimes (i N) instructions) or (do ((i first (1+ i))) ((>=i last)) instructions)	(loop for item in list do instructions) or (loop for item across vector do instructions) or (dolist (item list) instructions) or (mapc function list) or (map type function sequence)
Scheme	(do () (notcondition) instructions) or (let loop () (if condition (begin instructions (loop))))	(let loop () (instructions (if condition (loop))))	(do ((i first (+ i 1))) ((>= i last)) instructions) or (let loop ((i first1)) (if (< i last) (begin instructions (loop (+ i 1)))))	(for-each (lambda (item) instructions) list)
ISLISP	(while condition instructions)	(tagbody loop instructions (if condition (go loop))	(for ((i first (+ i 1))) ((>= i last)) instructions)	(mapc (lambda (item) instructions) list)
Pascal	while condition do begin instructions end	repeat instructions until notcondition;	for i := first «step 1» to last do begin instructions end;^{[a]}	for item in set do instructions
Visual Basic	Do While condition instructions Loop or Do Until notcondition instructions Loop or While condition instructions Wend (Visual Basic .NET uses End While instead)	Do instructions Loop While condition or Do instructions Loop Until notcondition	i must be declared beforehand. For i = first To last «Step 1» instructions Next i	For Each item In set instructions Next item
Visual Basic .NET	Do While condition instructions Loop or Do Until notcondition instructions Loop or While condition instructions Wend (Visual Basic .NET uses End While instead)	Do instructions Loop While condition or Do instructions Loop Until notcondition	For i« As type» = first To last« Step 1» instructions Next« i»^{[a]}	For Each item« As type» In set instructions Next« item»
Xojo	While condition instructions Wend	Do Until notcondition instructions Loop or Do instructions Loop Until notcondition	For i« As type» = first To last« Step 1» instructions Next« i»^{[a]}	For Each item« As type» In set instructions Next« item»
Python	while condition : Tab ↹instructions «else: Tab ↹instructions»	—N/a	Python 3.x: for i in range(first, last+1): Tab ↹instructions «else: Tab ↹instructions» Python 2.x: for i in xrange(first, last+1): Tab ↹instructions «else: Tab ↹instructions»	for item in set: Tab ↹instructions «else: Tab ↹instructions»
S-Lang	while (condition) { instructions } «then optional-block»	do { instructions } while (condition) «then optional-block»	for (i = first; i <= last; i++) { instructions } «then optional-block»	foreach item(set) «using (what)» { instructions } «then optional-block»
Fortran	DO WHILE (condition) instructions ENDDO	DO instructions IF (condition) EXIT; ENDDO	DO I = first,last instructions ENDDO	—N/a
Forth	BEGIN «instructions» condition WHILE instructions REPEAT	BEGIN instructions condition UNTIL	limit start DO instructions LOOP	—N/a
OCaml	while condition do instructions done	—N/a	for i = first to last do instructions done	Array.iter (fun item -> instructions) array or List.iter (fun item -> instructions) list
F#	while condition do Tab ↹instructions	—N/a	for i = first to last do Tab ↹instructions	for item in set do Tab ↹instructions or Seq.iter (fun item -> instructions) set
Standard ML	while condition do ( instructions )	—N/a		Array.app (fn item => instructions) array or app (fn item => instructions) list
Haskell (GHC)	—N/a		Control.Monad.forM_ [first..last] (\i -> do instructions)	Control.Monad.forM_list (\item -> do instructions)
Eiffel	from setup until condition loop instructions end			
CoffeeScript	while condition expression or expression while condition or while condition then expression or until condition expression or expression until condition or until expression then condition	—N/a	for i in [first..last] expression or for i in [first..last] then expression or expression for i in [first..last]	for item in set expression or for item in set then expression or expression for item in set
COBOL	PERFORM procedure-1 «THROUGH procedure-2» ««WITH» TEST BEFORE» UNTIL condition^{[c]} or PERFORM ««WITH» TEST BEFORE» UNTIL condition expression END-PERFORM	PERFORM procedure-1 «THROUGH procedure-2» «WITH» TEST AFTER UNTIL condition^{[c]} or PERFORM «WITH» TEST AFTER UNTIL condition expression END-PERFORM	PERFORM procedure-1 «THROUGH procedure-2» VARYING i FROM first BY increment UNTIL i > last^{[d]} or PERFORM VARYING i FROM first BY increment UNTIL i > last expression END-PERFORM^{[d]}	—N/a
Rust	while condition { expression }	loop { expression if condition { break; } }	for i in first..last+1 { expression } or for i in first..=last { expression }	for item in set { expression }^{[e]} or set.into_iter().for_each(|item| expression);^{[e]}

- ^a "step n" is used to change the loop interval. If "step" is omitted, then the loop interval is 1.
- ^b This implements the universal quantifier ("for all" or ∀) as well as the existential quantifier ("there exists" or ∃).
- ^c THRU may be used instead of THROUGH.
- ^d «IS» GREATER «THAN» may be used instead of >.
- ^e Type of set expression must implement trait std::iter::IntoIterator.

=== Exceptions ===
	throw	handler	assertion
Ada	raise exception_name «with string_expression»	begin statements exception when exception_list_{1} => statements; when exception_list_{2} => statements;... «when others => statements;» end^{[b]}	pragma Assert («Check =>» boolean_expression ««Message =>» string_expression») [function | procedure | entry] with Pre => boolean_expression Post => boolean_expression any_type with Type_Invariant => boolean_expression
APL	«string_expression» ⎕SIGNAL number_expression	:Trap number«s»_expression statements «:Case number«s»_expression statements»... «:Else number«s»_expression statements» :EndTrap	«string_expression» ⎕SIGNAL 98/⍨~condition
C (C99)	longjmp(state, exception);	switch (setjmp(state)) { case 0: instructions break; case exception: instructions ... }	assert(condition);
C++	throw exception;	try { instructions } catch «(exception)» { instructions } ...	assert(condition);
C#	throw exception;	try { instructions } catch «(exception« name»)» { instructions } ... «finally { instructions }»	System.Diagnostics.Debug.Assert(condition); or System.Diagnostics.Trace.Assert(condition);
Java	throw exception;	try { instructions } catch (exception) { instructions } ... «finally { instructions }»	assert condition «: description»;
JavaScript	throw exception;	try { instructions } catch (exception) { instructions} «finally { instructions }»	?
D	throw exception;	try { instructions } catch (exception) { instructions } ... «finally { instructions }»	assert(condition);
PHP	throw exception;	try { instructions } catch (exception) { instructions } ... «finally { instructions }»	assert(condition);
S-Lang	throw exception;	try { instructions } catch «exception» { instructions } ... «finally { instructions }»	?
Windows PowerShell	throw exception;	trap «[exception]» { instructions } ... instructions or try { instructions } catch «[exception]» { instructions } ... «finally { instructions }»	[Debug]::Assert(condition)
Objective-C	@throw exception;	@try { instructions } @catch (exception) { instructions } ... «@finally { instructions }»	NSAssert(condition, description);
Crystal	raise exception.new	begin instructions rescue exception instructions ... else instructions ensure instructions end	
Swift	throw exception (2.x)	do { try expression ... instructions } catch exception { instructions } ... (2.x)	assert(condition«, description»)
Perl	die exception;	eval { instructions }; if ($@) { instructions }	?
Raku	die exception;	try { instructions CATCH { when exception { instructions } ...}}	?
Ruby	raise exception	begin instructions rescue exception instructions... «else instructions» «ensure instructions» end	
Smalltalk	exception raise	instructionBlock on: exception do: handlerBlock	assert: conditionBlock
Common Lisp	(error "exception") or (error type arguments) or (error (make-condition type arguments))	(handler-case (progn instructions) (exception instructions)...) or (handler-bind (condition (lambda instructions «invoke-restart restart args»))...)^{[a]}	(assert condition) or (assert condition «(place) «error»») or (check-type var type)
Scheme (R^{6}RS)	(raise exception)	(guard (con (condition instructions) ...) instructions)	?
ISLISP	(error "error-string" objects) or (signal-condition condition continuable)	(with-handler handler form*)	?
Pascal	raise Exception.Create()	try Except on E: exception do begin instructions end; end;	?
Visual Basic	Err.Raise ERRORNUMBER	With New Try: On Error Resume Next; OneInstruction.Catch: On Error GoTo 0: Select Case .Number; Case SOME_ERRORNUMBER instructions End Select: End With '*** Try class *** Private mstrDescription As String Private mlngNumber As Long Public Sub Catch()     mstrDescription = Err.Description     mlngNumber = Err.Number End Sub Public Property Get Number() As Long     Number = mlngNumber End Property Public Property Get Description() As String     Description = mstrDescription End Property	Debug.Assert condition
Visual Basic .NET	Throw exception or Error errorcode	Try instructions Catch« name As exception»« When condition» instructions... «Finally instructions» End Try	System.Diagnostics.Debug.Assert(condition) or System.Diagnostics.Trace.Assert(condition)
Xojo	Raise exception	Try instructions Catch «exception» instructions... «Finally instructions» End Try	—N/a
Python	raise exception	try: Tab ↹instructions except «exception»: Tab ↹instructions... «else: Tab ↹instructions» «finally: Tab ↹instructions»	assert condition
Fortran	—N/a		
Forth	code THROW	xt CATCH ( code or 0 )	—N/a
OCaml	raise exception	try expression with pattern -> expression ...	assert condition
F#	raise exception	try expression with pattern -> expression ... or try expression finally expression	assert condition
Standard ML	raise exception «arg»	expression handle pattern => expression ...	
Haskell (GHC)	throw exception or throwError expression	catch tryExpression catchExpression or catchError tryExpression catchExpression	assert condition expression
COBOL	RAISE «EXCEPTION» exception	USE «AFTER» EXCEPTION OBJECT class-name. or USE «AFTER» EO class-name. or USE «AFTER» EXCEPTION CONDITION exception-name «FILE file-name». or USE «AFTER» EC exception-name «FILE file-name».	—N/a
Rust	No		assert!(condition)

- ^a Common Lisp allows with-simple-restart, restart-case and restart-bind to define restarts for use with invoke-restart. Unhandled conditions may cause the implementation to show a restarts menu to the user before unwinding the stack.
- ^b Uncaught exceptions are propagated to the innermost dynamically enclosing execution. Exceptions are not propagated across tasks (unless these tasks are currently synchronised in a rendezvous).

=== Other control flow statements ===
	exit block (break)	continue	label	branch (goto)	return value from generator
Ada	exit «loop_name» «when condition»	—N/a	label:	goto label	—N/a
ALGOL 68	value exit; ...	do statements; skip exit; label: statements od	label: ...	go to label; ... goto label; ... label; ...	yield(value) (Callback)
APL	:Leave	:Continue	label:	→label or :GoTo label	—N/a
C (C99)	break;	continue;	label:	goto label;	—N/a
Objective-C	break;	continue;	label:	goto label;	—N/a
C++ (STL)	break;	continue;	label:	goto label;	—N/a
D	break;	continue;	label:	goto label;	—N/a
C#	break;	continue;	label:	goto label;	yield return value;
Java	break «label»;	continue «label»;	label:	—N/a	
JavaScript	break «label»;	continue «label»;	label:	—N/a	yield value«;»
PHP	break «levels»;	continue «levels»;	label:	goto label;	yield «key =>» value;
Perl	last «label»;	next «label»;	label:	goto label;	
Raku	last «label»;	next «label»;	label:	goto label;	
Go	break «label»	continue «label»	label:	goto label	
Swift	break «label»	continue «label»	label:	—N/a	
Bash shell	break «levels»	continue «levels»	—N/a	—N/a	—N/a
Common Lisp	(return) or (return-from block) or (loop-finish)		(tagbody tag... tag...)	(go tag)	
Crystal	break	next	data-sort-value="" style="background: var(--background-color-interactive, #ececec); color: var(--color-base, inherit); vertical-align: middle; text-align: center; " class="table-na" | —N/a		yield value
Scheme					
ISLISP	(return-from block)		(tagbody tag... tag...)	(go tag)	
Pascal (ISO)	—N/a		label:^{[a]}	goto label;	—N/a
Pascal (FPC)	break;	continue;	label:^{[a]}	goto label;	—N/a
Visual Basic	Exit blockAlternatively, for methods, Return	—N/a	label:	GoTo label	—N/a
Xojo	Exit blockAlternatively, for methods, Return	Continue block	label:	GoTo label	—N/a
Visual Basic .NET	Exit blockAlternatively, for methods, Return	Continue block	label:	GoTo label	Yield value
Python	break	continue	—N/a		yield value
RPG IV	LEAVE;	ITER;			
S-Lang	break;	continue;			
Fortran	EXIT	CYCLE	label^{[b]}	GOTO label	—N/a
Ruby	break	next			
Windows PowerShell	break «label»	continue			
OCaml	—N/a				
F#	—N/a				
Standard ML	—N/a				
Haskell (GHC)	—N/a				
COBOL	EXIT PERFORM or EXIT PARAGRAPH or EXIT SECTION or EXIT.	EXIT PERFORM CYCLE	label «SECTION».	GO TO label	—N/a

- ^a Pascal has declaration blocks. See functions.
- ^b label must be a number between 1 and 99999.

== Functions ==
See reflective programming for calling and declaring functions by strings.

	calling a function	basic/void function	value-returning function	required main function
Ada	foo «(parameters)»	procedure foo «(parameters)» is begin statements end foo	function foo «(parameters)» return type is begin statements end foo	—N/a
ALGOL 68	foo «(parameters)»;	proc foo = «(parameters)» void: ( instructions );	proc foo = «(parameters)» rettype: ( instructions ...; retvalue );	—N/a
APL	«parameters» foo parameters	foo←{ statements }	foo←{ statements }	—N/a
C (C99)	foo(«parameters»)	void foo(«parameters») { instructions }	type foo(«parameters») { instructions ... return value; }	«global declarations» int main(«int argc, char *argv[]») { instructions }
Objective-C	foo(«parameters»)	void foo(«parameters») { instructions }	type foo(«parameters») { instructions ... return value; }	«global declarations» int main(«int argc, char *argv[]») { instructions }
C++ (STL)	foo(«parameters»)	void foo(«parameters») { instructions }	type foo(«parameters») { instructions ... return value; }	«global declarations» int main(«int argc, char *argv[]») { instructions }
Java	foo(«parameters»)	void foo(«parameters») { instructions }	type foo(«parameters») { instructions ... return value; }	public static void main(String[] args) { instructions } or public static void main(String... args) { instructions }
D	foo(«parameters»)	void foo(«parameters») { instructions }	type foo(«parameters») { instructions ... return value; }	int main(«char[][] args») { instructions} or int main(«string[] args») { instructions} or void main(«char[][] args») { instructions} or void main(«string[] args») { instructions}
C#	foo(«parameters»)	Same as above; alternatively, if only one statement: void foo(«parameters») => statement;	Same as above; alternatively, if simple enough to be an expression: void foo(«parameters») => expression;	static void Main(«string[] args») method_body May instead return int. (starting with C# 7.1:) May return Task or Task<int>, and if so, may be async.
JavaScript	foo(«parameters»)	function foo(«parameters») { instructions } or var foo = function («parameters») { instructions } or var foo = new Function ("«parameter»", ..., "«last parameter»" "instructions");	function foo(«parameters») { instructions ... return value; }	—N/a
Go	foo(«parameters»)	func foo(«parameters») { instructions }	func foo(«parameters») type { instructions ... return value }	func main() {|go instructions }
Swift	foo(«parameters»)	func foo(«parameters») { instructions }	func foo(«parameters») -> type { instructions ... return value }	—N/a
Crystal	foo(parameters) or foo parameters^{[f]}	def foo(parameters) instructions end	def foo(parameters) : type instructions return_value end^{[e]}	—N/a
Common Lisp	(foo «parameters»)	(defun foo («parameters») instructions) or (setf (symbol-function 'symbol) function)	(defun foo («parameters»)... value)	—N/a
Scheme	(foo «parameters»)	(define (foo parameters) instructions) or (define foo (lambda (parameters) instructions))	(define (foo parameters) instructions... return_value) or (define foo (lambda (parameters) instructions... return_value))	—N/a
ISLISP	(foo «parameters»)	(defun foo («parameters») instructions)	(defun foo («parameters»)... value)	—N/a
Pascal	foo«(parameters)»	procedure foo«(parameters)»; «forward;»^{[a]} «label label declarations» «const constant declarations» «type type declarations» «var variable declarations» «local function declarations» begin instructions end;	function foo«(parameters)»: type; «forward;»^{[a]} «label label declarations» «const constant declarations» «type type declarations» «var variable declarations» «local function declarations» begin instructions; foo := value end;	program name; «label label declarations» «const constant declarations» «type type declarations» «var variable declarations» «function declarations» begin instructions end.
Visual Basic	Foo(«parameters»)	Sub Foo«(parameters)» instructions End Sub	Function Foo«(parameters)»« As type» instructions Foo = value End Function	Sub Main() instructions End Sub
Visual Basic .NET	Foo(«parameters»)	Sub Foo«(parameters)» instructions End Sub	Same as above; alternatively: Function Foo«(parameters)»« As type» instructions Return value End Function; The As clause is not required if Option Strict is off. A type character may be used instead of the As clause. If control exits the function without a return value having been explicitly specified, the function returns the default value for the return type.	Sub Main(««ByVal »args() As String») instructions End Subor; Function Main(««ByVal »args() As String») As Integer instructions End Function
Xojo	Foo(«parameters»)	Sub Foo«(parameters)» instructions End Sub	Same as above; alternatively: Function Foo«(parameters)»« As type» instructions Return value End Function; The As clause is not required if Option Strict is off. A type character may be used instead of the As clause. If control exits the function without a return value having been explicitly specified, the function returns the default value for the return type.	Sub Main(««ByVal »args() As String») instructions End Subor; Function Main(««ByVal »args() As String») As Integer instructions End Function
Python	foo(«parameters»)	def foo(«parameters»): Tab ↹instructions	def foo(«parameters»): Tab ↹instructions Tab ↹return value	—N/a
S-Lang	foo(«parameters» «;qualifiers»)	define foo («parameters») { instructions }	define foo («parameters») { instructions ... return value; }	public define slsh_main () { instructions }
Fortran	foo («arguments»); CALL sub_foo («arguments»)^{[c]}	SUBROUTINE sub_foo («arguments») instructions END SUBROUTINE^{[c]}	type FUNCTION foo («arguments») instructions... foo = value END FUNCTION^{[c]}	PROGRAM main instructions END PROGRAM
Forth	«parameters» FOO	: FOO « stack effect comment: ( before -- ) » instructions;	: FOO « stack effect comment: ( before -- after ) » instructions;	—N/a
PHP	foo(«parameters»)	function foo(«parameters») { instructions }	function foo(«parameters») { instructions ... return value; }	—N/a
Perl	foo(«parameters») or &foo«(parameters)»	sub foo { «my (parameters) = @_;» instructions }	sub foo { «my (parameters) = @_;» instructions... «return» value; }	—N/a
Raku	foo(«parameters») or &foo«(parameters)»	«multi »sub foo(parameters) { instructions }	«our «type» »«multi »sub foo(parameters) { instructions ... «return» value; }	—N/a
Ruby	foo«(parameters)»	def foo«(parameters)» instructions end	def foo«(parameters)» instructions «return» value end	—N/a
Rust	foo(«parameters»)	fn foo(«parameters») { instructions }	fn foo(«parameters») -> type { instructions }	fn main() { instructions }
Scala	foo«(parameters)»	def foo«(parameters)»«: Unit =» { instructions }	def foo«(parameters)»«: type» = { instructions ... «return» value }	def main(args: Array[String]) { instructions }
Windows PowerShell	foo «parameters»	function foo { instructions }; or function foo { «param(parameters)» instructions }	function foo «(parameters)» { instructions ... return value }; or function foo { «param(parameters)» instructions ... return value }	—N/a
Bash shell	foo «parameters»	function foo { instructions } or foo () { instructions }	function foo { instructions return «exit_code» } or foo () { instructions return «exit_code» }	—N/a
Bash shell	foo «parameters»	parameters; $n ($1, $2, $3, ...); $@ (all parameters); $# (the number of parameters); $0 (this function name)		—N/a
OCaml	foo parameters	let «rec» foo parameters = instructions	let «rec» foo parameters = instructions... return_value	—N/a
F#	foo parameters	let «rec» foo parameters = instructions	let «rec» foo parameters = instructions... return_value	[<EntryPoint>] let main args = instructions
Standard ML	foo parameters	fun foo parameters = ( instructions )	fun foo parameters = ( instructions... return_value )	
Haskell	foo parameters	foo parameters = do Tab ↹instructions	foo parameters = return_value or foo parameters = do Tab ↹instructions Tab ↹return value	«main :: IO ()» main = do instructions
Eiffel	foo («parameters»)	foo («parameters») require preconditions do instructions ensure postconditions end	foo («parameters»): type require preconditions do instructions Result := value ensure postconditions end	^{[b]}
CoffeeScript	foo()	foo = ->	foo = -> value	—N/a
CoffeeScript	foo parameters	foo = () ->	foo = ( parameters ) -> value	—N/a
COBOL	CALL "foo" «USING parameters» «exception-handling» «END-CALL»^{[d]}	«IDENTIFICATION DIVISION.» PROGRAM-ID. foo. «other divisions...» PROCEDURE DIVISION «USING parameters». instructions.	«IDENTIFICATION DIVISION.» PROGRAM-ID/FUNCTION-ID. foo. «other divisions...» DATA DIVISION. «other sections...» LINKAGE SECTION. «parameter definitions...» variable-to-return definition «other sections...» PROCEDURE DIVISION «USING parameters» RETURNING variable-to-return. instructions.	—N/a
COBOL	«FUNCTION» foo«(«parameters»)»	—N/a	«IDENTIFICATION DIVISION.» PROGRAM-ID/FUNCTION-ID. foo. «other divisions...» DATA DIVISION. «other sections...» LINKAGE SECTION. «parameter definitions...» variable-to-return definition «other sections...» PROCEDURE DIVISION «USING parameters» RETURNING variable-to-return. instructions.	—N/a

- ^a Pascal requires "forward;" for forward declarations.
- ^b Eiffel allows the specification of an application's root class and feature.
- ^c In Fortran, function/subroutine parameters are called arguments (since PARAMETER is a language keyword); the CALL keyword is required for subroutines.
- ^d Instead of using "foo", a string variable may be used instead containing the same value.
- ^eIn Crystal, the return keyword is unnecessary. Instead, the final statement in a function's control flow is considered the return value.
- ^fCrystal function calls require parentheses around the parameters only when there is syntactical ambiguity (for example, when a function that takes multiple parameters is provided as a parameter to another function), or when declaring a function.

== Type conversions ==
Where string is a signed decimal number:

	string to integer	string to long integer	string to floating point	integer to string	floating point to string
Ada	Integer'Value (string_expression)	Long_Integer'Value (string_expression)	Float'Value (string_expression)	Integer'Image (integer_expression)	Float'Image (float_expression)
ALGOL 68 with general, and then specific formats	With prior declarations and association of: string buf := "12345678.9012e34 "; file proxy; associate(proxy, buf);				
ALGOL 68 with general, and then specific formats	get(proxy, ivar);	get(proxy, livar);	get(proxy, rvar);	put(proxy, ival);	put(proxy, rval);
ALGOL 68 with general, and then specific formats	getf(proxy, ($g$, ivar)); or getf(proxy, ($dddd$, ivar));	getf(proxy, ($g$, livar)); or getf(proxy, ($8d$, livar));	getf(proxy, ($g$, rvar)); or getf(proxy, ($8d.4dE2d$, rvar));	putf(proxy, ($g$, ival)); or putf(proxy, ($4d$, ival));	putf(proxy, ($g(width, places, exp)$, rval)); or putf(proxy, ($8d.4dE2d$, rval));
APL	⍎string_expression	⍎string_expression	⍎string_expression	⍕integer_expression	⍕float_expression
C (C99)	integer = atoi(string);	long = atol(string);	float = atof(string);	sprintf(string, "%i", integer);	sprintf(string, "%f", float);
Objective-C	integer = [string intValue];	long = [string longLongValue];	float = [string doubleValue];	string = [NSString stringWithFormat:@"%i", integer];	string = [NSString stringWithFormat:@"%f", float];
C++ (STL)	«std::»istringstream(string) >> number;			«std::»ostringstream o; o << number; string = o.str();	
C++11	integer = «std::»stoi(string);	long = «std::»stol(string);	float = «std::»stof(string); double = «std::»stod(string);	string = «std::»to_string(number);	
C#	integer = int.Parse(string);	long = long.Parse(string);	float = float.Parse(string);double = double.Parse(string);	string = number.ToString();	
Crystal	int32 = string.to_i32	int64 = string.to_i64	float32 = string.to_f32 float64 = string.to_f64	string = number.to_s	string = float.to_s
D	integer = std.conv.to!int(string)	long = std.conv.to!long(string)	float = std.conv.to!float(string) double = std.conv.to!double(string)	string = std.conv.to!string(number)	
Java	integer = Integer.parseInt(string);	long = Long.parseLong(string);	float = Float.parseFloat(string); double = Double.parseDouble(string);	string = Integer.toString(integer); string = String.valueOf(integer);	string = Float.toString(float); string = Double.toString(double);
JavaScript^{[a]}	integer = parseInt(string);		float = parseFloat(string); float = new Number (string); float = Number (string); float = +string;	string = number.toString (); string = String (number); string = number+""; string = `${number}`	
Go	integer, error = strconv.Atoi(string) integer, error = strconv.ParseInt(string, 10, 0)	long, error = strconv.ParseInt(string, 10, 64)	float, error = strconv.ParseFloat(string, 64)	string = strconv.Itoa(integer) string = strconv.FormatInt(integer, 10) string = fmt.Sprint(integer)	string = strconv.FormatFloat(float) string = fmt.Sprint(float)
Rust^{[d]}	string.parse::<i32>() i32::from_str(string)	string.parse::<i64>() i64::from_str(string)	string.parse::<f64>() f64::from_str(string)	integer.to_string()	float.to_string()
Common Lisp	(setf integer (parse-integer string))		(setf float (read-from-string string))	(setf string (princ-to-string number))	
Scheme	(define number (string->number string))			(define string (number->string number))	
ISLISP	(setf integer (convert string <integer>))		(setf float (convert string <float>))	(setf string (convert number <string>))	
Pascal	integer := StrToInt(string);		float := StrToFloat(string);	string := IntToStr(integer);	string := FloatToStr(float);
Visual Basic	integer = CInt(string)	long = CLng(string)	float = CSng(string) double = CDbl(string)	string = CStr(number)	
Visual Basic .NET (can use both VB syntax above and .NET methods shown right)	integer = Integer.Parse(string)	long = Long.Parse(string)	float = Single.Parse(string) double = Double.Parse(string)	string = number.ToString()	
Xojo	integer = Val(string)	long = Val(string)	double = Val(string) double = CDbl(string)	string = CStr(number) or string = Str(number)	
Python	integer = int(string)	long = long(string)	float = float(string)	string = str(number)	
S-Lang	integer = atoi(string);	long = atol(string);	float = atof(string);	string = string(number);	
Fortran	READ(string,format) number			WRITE(string,format) number	
PHP	integer = intval(string); or integer = (int)string;		float = floatval(string); float = (float)string;	string = "$number"; or string = strval(number); or string = (string)number;	
Perl^{[b]}	number = 0 + string;			string = "number";	
Raku	number = +string;			string = ~number;	
Ruby	integer = string.to_i or integer = Integer(string)		float = string.to_f float = Float(string)	string = number.to_s	
Scala	integer = string.toInt	long = string.toLong	float = string.toFloatdouble = string.toDouble	string = number.toString	
Smalltalk	integer := Integer readFrom: string		float := Float readFrom: string	string := number asString	
Windows PowerShell	integer = [int]string	long = [long]string	float = [float]string	string = [string]number; or string = "number"; or string = (number).ToString()	
OCaml	let integer = int_of_string string		let float = float_of_string string	let string = string_of_int integer	let string = string_of_float float
F#	let integer = int string	let integer = int64 string	let float = float string	let string = string number	
Standard ML	val integer = Int.fromString string		val float = Real.fromString string	val string = Int.toString integer	val string = Real.toString float
Haskell (GHC)	number = read string			string = show number	
COBOL	MOVE «FUNCTION» NUMVAL(string)^{[c]} TO number			MOVE number TO numeric-edited	

- ^a JavaScript only uses floating point numbers so there are some technicalities.
- ^b Perl doesn't have separate types. Strings and numbers are interchangeable.
- ^c NUMVAL-C or NUMVAL-F may be used instead of NUMVAL.
- str::parse is available to convert any type that has an implementation of the std::str::FromStr trait. Both str::parse and FromStr::from_str return a Result that contains the specified type if there is no error. The turbofish (::<_>) on str::parse can be omitted if the type can be inferred from context.

== Standard stream I/O ==
	read from	write to	
	stdin	stdout	stderr
Ada	Get (x)	Put (x)	Put (Standard_Error, x)
ALGOL 68	readf(($format$, x)); or getf(stand in, ($format$, x));	printf(($format$, x)); or putf(stand out, ($format$, x));	putf(stand error, ($format$, x));^{[a]}
APL	x←⎕	⎕←x	⍞←x
C (C99)	scanf(format, &x); or fscanf(stdin, format, &x);^{[b]}	printf(format, x); or fprintf(stdout, format, x);^{[c]}	fprintf(stderr, format, x);^{[d]}
Objective-C	data = [[NSFileHandle fileHandleWithStandardInput] readDataToEndOfFile];	[[NSFileHandle fileHandleWithStandardOutput] writeData:data];	[[NSFileHandle fileHandleWithStandardError] writeData:data];
C++	«std::»cin >> x; or «std::»getline(«std::»cin, str);	«std::»cout << x;	«std::»cerr << x; or «std::»clog << x;
C#	x = Console.Read(); or x = Console.ReadLine();	Console.Write(«format, »x); or Console.WriteLine(«format, »x);	Console.Error.Write(«format, »x); or Console.Error.WriteLine(«format, »x);
Crystal	x = gets	puts x or puts(x) or printf $format$, x or printf($format$, x)	STDERR.puts x or STDERR.puts(x) or STDERR.printf $format$, x or STDERR.printf($format$, x)
D	x = std.stdio.readln()	std.stdio.write(x) or std.stdio.writeln(x) or std.stdio.writef(format, x) or std.stdio.writefln(format, x)	stderr.write(x) or stderr.writeln(x) or std.stdio.writef(stderr, format, x) or std.stdio.writefln(stderr, format, x)
Java	x = System.in.read(); or x = new Scanner(System.in).nextInt(); or x = new Scanner(System.in).nextLine();	System.out.print(x); or System.out.printf(format, x); or System.out.println(x);	System.err.print(x); or System.err.printf(format, x); or System.err.println(x);
Go	fmt.Scan(&x) or fmt.Scanf(format, &x) or x = bufio.NewReader(os.Stdin).ReadString('\n')	fmt.Println(x) or fmt.Printf(format, x)	fmt.Fprintln(os.Stderr, x) or fmt.Fprintf(os.Stderr, format, x)
Swift	x = readLine() (2.x)	print(x) (2.x) println(x) (1.x)	
JavaScript; Web Browser implementation		document.write(x)	
JavaScript; Active Server Pages		Response.Write(x)	
JavaScript; Windows Script Host	x = WScript.StdIn.Read(chars) or x = WScript.StdIn.ReadLine()	WScript.Echo(x) or WScript.StdOut.Write(x) or WScript.StdOut.WriteLine(x)	WScript.StdErr.Write(x) or WScript.StdErr.WriteLine(x)
Common Lisp	(setf x (read-line))	(princ x) or (format t format x)	(princ x *error-output*) or (format *error-output* format x)
Scheme (R^{6}RS)	(define x (read-line))	(display x) or (format #t format x)	(display x (current-error-port)) or (format (current-error-port) format x)
ISLISP	(setf x (read-line))	(format (standard-output) format x)	(format (error-output) format x)
Pascal	read(x); or readln(x);	write(x); or writeln(x);	write(stderr, x); or writeln(stderr, x);
Visual Basic	Input« prompt,» x	Print x or ? x	—N/a
Visual Basic .NET	x = Console.Read() or x = Console.ReadLine()	Console.Write(«format,»x) or Console.WriteLine(«format, »x)	Console.Error.Write(«format, »x) or Console.Error.WriteLine(«format, »x)
Xojo	x = StandardInputStream.Read() or x = StandardInputStreame.ReadLine()	StandardOutputStream.Write(x) or StandardOutputStream.WriteLine(x)	StdErr.Write(x) or StdErr.WriteLine(x)
Python 2.x	x = raw_input(«prompt»)	print x or sys.stdout.write(x)	print >> sys.stderr, x or sys.stderr.write(x)
Python 3.x	x = input(«prompt»)	print(x«, end=""»)	print(x«, end=""», file=sys.stderr)
S-Lang	fgets (&x, stdin)	fputs (x, stdout)	fputs (x, stderr)
Fortran	READ(*,format) variable names or READ(INPUT_UNIT,format) variable names^{[e]}	WRITE(*,format) expressions or WRITE(OUTPUT_UNIT,format) expressions^{[e]}	WRITE(ERROR_UNIT,format) expressions^{[e]}
Forth	buffer length ACCEPT ( # chars read ) KEY ( char )	buffer length TYPE char EMIT	—N/a
PHP	$x = fgets(STDIN); or $x = fscanf(STDIN, format);	print x; or echo x; or printf(format, x);	fprintf(STDERR, format, x);
Perl	$x = <>; or $x = <STDIN>;	print x; or printf format, x;	print STDERR x; or printf STDERR format, x;
Raku	$x = $*IN.get;	x.print or x.say	x.note or $*ERR.print(x) or $*ERR.say(x)
Ruby	x = gets	puts x or printf(format, x)	$stderr.puts(x) or $stderr.printf(format, x)
Windows PowerShell	$x = Read-Host«« -Prompt» text»; or $x = [Console]::Read(); or $x = [Console]::ReadLine()	x; or Write-Output x; or echo x	Write-Error x
OCaml	let x = read_int () or let str = read_line () or Scanf.scanf format (fun x ... -> ...)	print_int x or print_endline str or Printf.printf format x ...	prerr_int x or prerr_endline str or Printf.eprintf format x ...
F#	let x = System.Console.ReadLine()	printf format x ... or printfn format x ...	eprintf format x ... or eprintfn format x ...
Standard ML	val str = TextIO.inputLIne TextIO.stdIn	print str	TextIO.output (TextIO.stdErr, str)
Haskell (GHC)	x <- readLn or str <- getLine	print x or putStrLn str	hPrint stderr x or hPutStrLn stderr str
COBOL	ACCEPT x	DISPLAY x	

- ^a ALGOL 68 additionally as the "unformatted" transput routines: read, write, get, and put.
- ^b gets(x) and fgets(x, length, stdin) read unformatted text from stdin. Use of gets is not recommended.
- ^c puts(x) and fputs(x, stdout) write unformatted text to stdout.
- ^d fputs(x, stderr) writes unformatted text to stderr
- ^e INPUT_UNIT, OUTPUT_UNIT, ERROR_UNIT are defined in the ISO_FORTRAN_ENV module.

== Reading command-line arguments ==
	Argument values	Argument counts	Program name / Script name
Ada	Argument (n)	Argument_Count	Command_Name
C (C99)	argv[n]	argc	first argument
Objective-C	argv[n]	argc	first argument
C++	argv[n]	argc	first argument
C#	args[n]	args.Length	Assembly.GetEntryAssembly().Location;
Java	args[n]	args.length	
D	args[n]	args.length	first argument
Crystal	ARGV[n]	ARGV.size	PROGRAM_NAME
JavaScript; Windows Script Host implementation	WScript.Arguments(n)	WScript.Arguments.length	WScript.ScriptName or WScript.ScriptFullName
Go	os.Args[n]	len(os.Args)	first argument
Rust^{[a]}	std::env::args().nth(n) std::env::args_os().nth(n)	std::env::args().count() std::env::args_os().count()	std::env::args().next() std::env::args_os().next()
Swift	Process.arguments[n] or Process.unsafeArgv[n]	Process.arguments.count or Process.argc	first argument
Common Lisp	?	?	?
Scheme (R^{6}RS)	(list-ref (command-line) n)	(length (command-line))	first argument
ISLISP	—N/a	—N/a	—N/a
Pascal	ParamStr(n)	ParamCount	first argument
Visual Basic	Command^{[b]}	—N/a	App.Path
Visual Basic .NET	CmdArgs(n)	CmdArgs.Length	[Assembly].GetEntryAssembly().Location
Xojo	System.CommandLine	(string parsing)	Application.ExecutableFile.Name
Python	sys.argv[n]	len(sys.argv)	first argument
S-Lang	__argv[n]	__argc	first argument
Fortran	DO i = 1,argc CALL GET_COMMAND_ARGUMENT (i,argv(i)); ENDDO	argc = COMMAND_ARGUMENT_COUNT ()	CALL GET_COMMAND_ARGUMENT (0,progname)
PHP	$argv[n]	$argc	first argument
Bash shell	$n ($1, $2, $3, ...) $@ (all arguments)	$#	$0
Perl	$ARGV[n]	scalar(@ARGV)	$0
Raku	@*ARGS[n]	@*ARGS.elems	$PROGRAM_NAME
Ruby	ARGV[n]	ARGV.size	$0
Windows PowerShell	$args[n]	$args.Length	$MyInvocation.MyCommand.Name
OCaml	Sys.argv.(n)	Array.length Sys.argv	first argument
F#	args.[n]	args.Length	Assembly.GetEntryAssembly().Location
Standard ML	List.nth (CommandLine.arguments (), n)	length (CommandLine.arguments ())	CommandLine.name ()
Haskell (GHC)	do { args <- System.getArgs; return length args !! n}	do { args <- System.getArgs; return length args}	System.getProgName
COBOL	^{[c]}		—N/a

- ^a In Rust, std::env::args and std::env::args_os return iterators, std::env::Args and std::env::ArgsOs respectively. Args converts each argument to a String and it panics if it reaches an argument that cannot be converted to UTF-8. ArgsOs returns a non-lossy representation of the raw strings from the operating system (std::ffi::OsString), which can be invalid UTF-8.
- ^b In Visual Basic, command-line arguments are not separated. Separating them requires a split function Split(string).
- ^c The COBOL standard includes no means to access command-line arguments, but common compiler extensions to access them include defining parameters for the main program or using ACCEPT statements.

== Execution of commands ==
	Shell command	Execute program	Replace current program with new executed program
Ada	Not part of the language standard. Commonly done by compiler provided packages or by interfacing to C or POSIX.		
C	system("command");		execl(path, args); or execv(path, arglist);
C++	system("command");		execl(path, args); or execv(path, arglist);
Objective-C	system("command");	[NSTask launchedTaskWithLaunchPath:(NSString *)path arguments:(NSArray *)arguments];	
C#		System.Diagnostics.Process.Start(path, argstring);	
F#		System.Diagnostics.Process.Start(path, argstring);	
Crystal	`command` or Process.run command	Process.run path, args	Process.exec path, args
Go		exec.Run(path, argv, envv, dir, exec.DevNull, exec.DevNull, exec.DevNull)	os.Exec(path, argv, envv)
Visual Basic	Interaction.Shell(command «, WindowStyle» «, isWaitOnReturn»)		
Visual Basic .NET	Microsoft.VisualBasic.Interaction.Shell(command «, WindowStyle» «, isWaitOnReturn»)	System.Diagnostics.Process.Start(path, argstring)	
Xojo	Shell.Execute(command «, Parameters»)	FolderItem.Launch(parameters, activate)	—N/a
D	std.process.system("command");		std.process.execv(path, arglist);
Java		Runtime.exec(command); or new ProcessBuilder(command).start();	
JavaScript; Windows Script Host implementation	WScript.CreateObject ("WScript.Shell").Run(command «, WindowStyle» «, isWaitOnReturn»);	WshShell.Exec(command)	
Common Lisp	(uiop:run-program command)		
Scheme	(system command)		
ISLISP	—N/a	—N/a	—N/a
Pascal	system(command);		
OCaml	Sys.command command, Unix.open_process_full command env (stdout, stdin, stderr),...	Unix.create_process prog args new_stdin new_stdout new_stderr, ...	Unix.execv prog args or Unix.execve prog args env
Standard ML	OS.Process.system command	Unix.execute (path, args)	Posix.Process.exec (path, args)
Haskell (GHC)	System.system command	System.Process.runProcess path args ...	Posix.Process.executeFile path True args ...
Perl	system(command) or $output = `command` or $output = qx(command)		exec(path, args)
Ruby	system(command) or output = `command`		exec(path, args)
PHP	system(command) or $output = `command` or exec(command) or passthru(command)		
Python	os.system(command) or subprocess.Popen(command)	subprocess.call(["program", "arg1", "arg2", ...])	os.execv(path, args)
S-Lang	system(command)		
Fortran	CALL EXECUTE_COMMAND_LINE (COMMAND «, WAIT» «, EXITSTAT» «, CMDSTAT» «, CMDMSG»)^{[a]}		
Windows PowerShell	[Diagnostics.Process]::Start(command)	«Invoke-Item »program arg1 arg2 ...	
Bash shell	output=`command` or output=$(command)	program arg1 arg2 ...	

^a Fortran 2008 or newer.

== See also ==
- List of open-source programming languages
