= %s =

%s may refer to:

== C string ==
- %s, in printf format string
- %s, in scanf format string

== System time ==
- %s, seconds in the strftime format string
- %s, used to check the Unix timestamp

== Web browsers and websites ==
- %s as a smart bookmark marker showing where to insert an argument string
- %s in a quick searchbox, used for customisation for web browsers such as Opera, Chromium and Firefox
