= %d =

%d may refer to:

== C string ==
- %d, in printf format string
- %d, in scanf format string

== System time ==
- %d, day of the month in the strftime format string
