= Printf (Unix) =

Shell command for formatting and outputting text; like printf() library function

printf
- Developers: Various open-source and commercial developers
- Operating system: Unix and Unix-like
- Platform: Cross-platform
- Type: Command
- License: coreutils: GPLv3+

printf is a shell command that formats and outputs text like the same-named C function. It is available in a variety of Unix and Unix-like systems. Some shells implement the command as builtin and some provide it as a utility program

The command has similar syntax and semantics as the library function. The command outputs text to standard output as specified by a format string and a list of values. Characters of the format string are copied to the output verbatim except when a format specifier is found which causes a value to be output per the specifier.

The command has some aspects unlike the library function. In addition to the library function format specifiers, %b causes the command to expand backslash escape sequences (for example \n for newline), and %q outputs an item that can be used as shell input. The value used for an unmatched specifier (too few values) is an empty string for %s or 0 for a numeric specifier. If there are more values than specifiers, then the command restarts processing the format string from its beginning,

The command is part of the X/Open Portability Guide since issue 4 of 1992. It was inherited into the first version of POSIX.1 and the Single Unix Specification. It first appeared in 4.3BSD-Reno.

The implementation bundled in GNU Core Utilities was written by David MacKenzie. It has an extension %q for escaping strings in POSIX-shell format.

== Examples ==
This prints a list of numbers:

$ for N in 4 8 10; do printf " >> %03d << \n" $N; done
 >> 004 <<
 >> 008 <<
 >> 010 <<

This produces output for a directory's content similar to ls:

$ printf "%s\n" *
