= C file input/output =

Input/output functionality in the C programming language

The C programming language provides many standard library functions for file input and output. These functions make up the bulk of the C standard library header <stdio.h>. The functionality descends from a "portable I/O package" written by Mike Lesk at Bell Labs in the early 1970s, and officially became part of the Unix operating system in Version 7.

The I/O functionality of C is fairly low-level by modern standards; C abstracts all file operations into operations on streams of bytes, which may be "input streams" or "output streams". Unlike some earlier programming languages, C has no direct support for random-access data files; to read from a record in the middle of a file, the programmer must create a stream, seek to the middle of the file, and then read bytes in sequence from the stream.

The stream model of file I/O was popularized by Unix, which was developed concurrently with the C programming language itself. The vast majority of modern operating systems have inherited streams from Unix, and many languages in the C programming language family have inherited C's file I/O interface with few if any changes (for example, PHP).

== Overview ==
This library uses what are called streams to operate with physical devices such as keyboards, printers, terminals or with any other type of files supported by the system. Streams are an abstraction to interact with these in a uniform way. All streams have similar properties independent of the individual characteristics of the physical media they are associated with.

=== Functions ===
Most of the C file input/output functions are defined in <stdio.h> (or in the C++ header <cstdio>, which contains the standard C functionality but in the std namespace).

	Byte character	Wide character	Description
File access	fopen		Opens a file (with a non-Unicode filename on Windows and possible UTF-8 filename on Linux)
File access	popen		opens a process by creating a pipe, forking, and invoking the shell
File access	freopen		Opens a different file with an existing stream
File access	fflush		Synchronizes an output stream with the actual file
File access	fclose		Closes a file
File access	pclose		closes a stream
File access	setbuf		Sets the buffer for a file stream
File access	setvbuf		Sets the buffer and its size for a file stream
File access	fwide		Switches a file stream between wide-character I/O and narrow-character I/O
Direct input/output	fread		Reads from a file
Direct input/output	fwrite		Writes to a file
Unformatted input/output	fgetc getc	fgetwc getwc	Reads a byte/wchar_t from a file stream
Unformatted input/output	fgets	fgetws	Reads a byte/wchar_t line from a file stream
Unformatted input/output	fputc putc	fputwc putwc	Writes a byte/wchar_t to a file stream
Unformatted input/output	fputs	fputws	Writes a byte/wchar_t string to a file stream
Unformatted input/output	getchar	getwchar	Reads a byte/wchar_t from stdin
Unformatted input/output	~~gets~~	—N/a	Reads a byte string from stdin until a newline or end of file is encountered (deprecated in C99, removed from C11)
Unformatted input/output	putchar	putwchar	Writes a byte/wchar_t to stdout
Unformatted input/output	puts	—N/a	Writes a byte string to stdout
Unformatted input/output	ungetc	ungetwc	Puts a byte/wchar_t back into a file stream
Formatted input/output	scanf fscanf sscanf	wscanf fwscanf swscanf	Reads formatted byte/wchar_t input from stdin, a file stream or a buffer
Formatted input/output	vscanf vfscanf vsscanf	vwscanf vfwscanf vswscanf	Reads formatted input byte/wchar_t from stdin, a file stream or a buffer using variable argument list
Formatted input/output	printf fprintf sprintf snprintf	wprintf fwprintf swprintf	Prints formatted byte/wchar_t output to stdout, a file stream or a buffer
Formatted input/output	vprintf vfprintf vsprintf vsnprintf	vwprintf vfwprintf vswprintf	Prints formatted byte/wchar_t output to stdout, a file stream, or a buffer using variable argument list
Formatted input/output	perror	—N/a	Writes a description of the current error to stderr
File positioning	ftell ftello		Returns the current file position indicator
File positioning	fseek fseeko		Moves the file position indicator to a specific location in a file
File positioning	fgetpos		Gets the file position indicator
File positioning	fsetpos		Moves the file position indicator to a specific location in a file
File positioning	rewind		Moves the file position indicator to the beginning in a file
Error handling	clearerr		Clears errors
Error handling	feof		Checks for the end-of-file
Error handling	ferror		Checks for a file error
Operations on files	remove		Erases a file
Operations on files	rename		Renames a file
Operations on files	tmpfile		Returns a pointer to a temporary file
Operations on files	tmpnam		Returns a unique filename

=== Constants ===
Constants defined in the <stdio.h> header include:

Name	Notes
EOF	A negative integer of type int used to indicate end-of-file conditions
BUFSIZ	An integer which is the size of the buffer used by the setbuf() function
FILENAME_MAX	The size of a char array which is large enough to store the name of any file that can be opened
FOPEN_MAX	The number of files that may be open simultaneously; will be at least eight
_IOFBF	An abbreviation for "input/output fully buffered"; it is an integer which may be passed to the setvbuf() function to request block buffered input and output for an open stream
_IOLBF	An abbreviation for "input/output line buffered"; it is an integer which may be passed to the setvbuf() function to request line buffered input and output for an open stream
_IONBF	An abbreviation for "input/output not buffered"; it is an integer which may be passed to the setvbuf() function to request unbuffered input and output for an open stream
L_tmpnam	The size of a char array which is large enough to store a temporary filename generated by the tmpnam() function
NULL	A macro expanding to the null pointer constant; that is, a constant representing a pointer value which is guaranteed not to be a valid address of an object in memory
SEEK_CUR	An integer which may be passed to the fseek() function to request positioning relative to the current file position
SEEK_END	An integer which may be passed to the fseek() function to request positioning relative to the end of the file
SEEK_SET	An integer which may be passed to the fseek() function to request positioning relative to the beginning of the file
TMP_MAX	The maximum number of unique filenames generable by the tmpnam() function; will be at least 25

=== Variables ===

Variables defined in the <stdio.h> header include:

Name	Notes
stdin	A pointer to a FILE which refers to the standard input stream, usually a keyboard.
stdout	A pointer to a FILE which refers to the standard output stream, usually a display terminal.
stderr	A pointer to a FILE which refers to the standard error stream, often a display terminal.

=== Member types ===
Data types defined in the <stdio.h> header include:

- FILE – also known as a file handle or a FILE pointer, this is an opaque pointer containing the information about a file or text stream needed to perform input or output operations on it, including:
  - platform-specific identifier of the associated I/O device, such as a file descriptor
  - the buffer
  - stream orientation indicator (unset, narrow, or wide)
  - stream buffering state indicator (unbuffered, line buffered, fully buffered)
  - I/O mode indicator (input stream, output stream, or update stream)
  - binary/text mode indicator
  - end-of-file indicator
  - error indicator
  - the current stream position and multibyte conversion state (an object of type mbstate_t)
  - reentrant lock (required as of C11)
- fpos_t – a non-array type capable of uniquely identifying the position of every byte in a file and every conversion state that can occur in all supported multibyte character encodings
- size_t – an unsigned integer type which is the type of the result of the sizeof operator.

=== Extensions ===
The POSIX standard defines several extensions to <stdio.h> in its Base Definitions, among which are a readline function that allocates memory, the fileno and fdopen functions that establish the link between FILE objects and file descriptors, and a group of functions for creating FILE objects that refer to in-memory buffers.

== Example ==
The following C program opens a binary file called myfile.bin, reads five bytes from it, and then closes the file.

#include <stdio.h>
#include <stdlib.h>

int main(void) {
    const char file_name[] = "myfile.bin";

    char buffer[5];
    FILE* fp = fopen(file_name, "rb");

    if (fp == NULL) {
        fprintf(stderr, "Failed to open file \"%s\"!\n", file_name);
        return EXIT_FAILURE;
    }

    size_t len = fread(buffer, 1, sizeof buffer, fp);
    if (len < sizeof buffer) {
        if (ferror(fp)) {
            fprintf(stderr, "Read error in \"%s\"\n", file_name);
        } else if (feof(fp)) {
            fprintf(stderr, "Unexpected end of file in \"%s\"\n", file_name);
        }
        fclose(fp);
        return EXIT_FAILURE;
    }

    fclose(fp);

    printf("The bytes read were: ");
    for (size_t i = 0; i < len; ++i) {
        printf("%02X ", (unsigned char)buffer[i]);
    }
    putchar('\n');

    return EXIT_SUCCESS;
}

== Alternatives to stdio ==
Several alternatives to <stdio.h> have been developed. Among these are C++ I/O headers <iostream> and <print>, part of the C++ Standard Library. ISO C++ still requires the <stdio.h> functionality, and it is found under header <cstdio>.

Other alternatives include the Sfio (A Safe/Fast I/O Library) library from AT&T Bell Laboratories. This library, introduced in 1991, aimed to avoid inconsistencies, unsafe practices and inefficiencies in the design of <stdio.h>. Among its features is the possibility to insert callback functions into a stream to customize the handling of data read from or written to the stream. It was released to the outside world in 1997, and the last official stable release was 2005-02-01

== See also ==
- printf
- scanf
- C++ input/output library
