= Printf =

C function to format and output text

An example call to the printf function

printf is a C standard library function and is also a Linux terminal (shell) command that formats text and writes it to standard output. The function accepts a format C-string argument and a variable number of value arguments that the function serializes per the format string. Mismatch between the format specifiers and count and type of values results in undefined behavior, and the program might crash or vulnerabilities may arise.

The format string is encoded as a template language consisting of verbatim text and format specifiers that each specify how to serialize a value. As the format string is processed left-to-right, a subsequent value is used for each format specifier found. A format specifier starts with a % character and has one or more following characters that specify how to serialize a value.

The standard library provides other, similar functions that form a family of printf-like functions. The functions share the same formatting capabilities but provide different behavior such as output to a different destination or safety measures that limit exposure to vulnerabilities. Functions of the printf-family have been implemented in other computer programming contexts (i.e., programming languages) with the same or similar syntax and semantics.

The scanf() C standard library function complements printf by providing formatted input (a.k.a. lexing, a.k.a. parsing) via a similar format string syntax.

The name, printf, is short for print formatted where print refers to output to a printer although the function is not limited to printer output. Today, print refers to output to any text-based environment such as a terminal or a file.

== Format specifier ==
Formatting of a value is specified as markup in the format string. For example, the following outputs Your age is and then the value of the variable age in decimal format.

printf("Your age is %d", age);

=== Syntax ===
The syntax for a format specifier is:

%[parameter][flags][width][.precision][length]type

=== Parameter field ===
The parameter field is optional. If included, then matching specifiers to values is not sequential. The numeric value n selects the n-th value parameter. This is a POSIX extension, not C99.

Text	Description
n$	n is the index of the value parameter to serialize using this format specifier

This field allows for using the same value multiple times in a format string instead of having to pass the value multiple times. If a specifier includes this field, then subsequent specifiers must also.

For example, printf("%2$d %2$#x; %1$d %1$#x",16,17); outputs: 17 0x11; 16 0x10

This field is very useful for localizing messages to different natural languages that use different word orders.

In the Windows API, support for this feature is via a different function, printf_p.

=== Flags field ===
The flags field can be zero or more of (in any order):

Text	Description
-	Left-align the output of this placeholder; default is to right-align the output
+	Prepends a plus sign for a positive value; by default a positive value does not have a prefix
(space)	Prepends a space character for a positive value; ignored if the + flag exists; by default a positive value does not have a prefix
0	When the 'width' option is specified, prepends zeros instead of spaces for numeric types; for example, printf("%4X",3) produces " 3", while printf("%04X",3); produces "0003"
'	The integer or exponent of a decimal has the thousands grouping separator applied
#	Alternate form: For g and G types, trailing zeros are not removed For f, F, e, E, g, G types, the output always contains a decimal point For o, x, X types, the text 0, 0x, 0X, respectively, is prepended to non-zero numbers

=== Width field ===
The width field specifies the minimum number of characters to output. If the value can be represented in fewer characters, then the value is left-padded with spaces so that output is the number of characters specified. If the value requires more characters, then the output is longer than the specified width. A value is never truncated.

For example, printf("%3d", 12); specifies a width of 3 and outputs 12 with a space on the left to output 3 characters. The call printf("%3d", 1234); outputs 1234 which is 4 characters long since that is the minimum width for that value even though the width specified is 3.

If the width field is omitted, the output is the minimum number of characters for the value.

If the field is specified as *, then the width value is read from the list of values in the call. For example, printf("%*d", 3, 10); outputs 10 (<space>10) where the second parameter, 3, is the width (matches with *) and 10 is the value to serialize (matches with d).

Though not part of the width field, a leading zero is interpreted as the zero-padding flag mentioned above, and a negative value is treated as the positive value in conjunction with the left-alignment - flag also mentioned above.

The width field can be used to format values as a table (tabulated output). But, columns do not align if any value is larger than fits in the width specified. For example, notice that the last line value (1234) does not fit in the first column of width 3 and therefore the column is not aligned.

  1   1
 12  12
123 123
1234 123

=== Precision field ===
The precision field usually specifies a maximum limit of the output, as set by the formatting type. For floating-point numeric types, it specifies the number of digits to the right of the decimal point to which the output should be rounded; for %g and %G it specifies the total number of significant figures (before and after the decimal, not including leading or trailing zeroes) to round to. For the string type, it limits the number of characters that should be output, after which the string is truncated.

The precision field may be omitted, or a numeric integer value, or a dynamic value when passed as another argument when indicated by an asterisk (*). For example, printf("%.*s", 3, "abcdef"); outputs abc.

=== Length field ===
The length field can be omitted or be any of:

Text	Description
hh	For integer types, causes printf to expect an int-sized integer argument which was promoted from a char.
h	For integer types, causes printf to expect an int-sized integer argument which was promoted from a short.
l	For integer types, causes printf to expect a long-sized integer argument. For floating-point types, this is ignored. float arguments are always promoted to double when used in a varargs call.
ll	For integer types, causes printf to expect a long long-sized integer argument.
L	For floating-point types, causes printf to expect a long double argument.
z	For integer types, causes printf to expect a size_t-sized integer argument.
j	For integer types, causes printf to expect a intmax_t-sized integer argument.
t	For integer types, causes printf to expect a ptrdiff_t-sized integer argument.

Platform-specific length options came to exist prior to widespread use of the ISO C99 extensions, including:

Text	Description	Commonly found platforms
I	For signed integer types, causes printf to expect ptrdiff_t-sized integer argument; for unsigned integer types, causes printf to expect size_t-sized integer argument	Win32/Win64
I32	For integer types, causes printf to expect a 32-bit (double word) integer argument	Win32/Win64
I64	For integer types, causes printf to expect a 64-bit (quad word) integer argument	Win32/Win64
q	For integer types, causes printf to expect a 64-bit (quad word) integer argument	BSD

ISO C99 includes the inttypes.h header file that includes a number of macros for cross-platform printf coding. For example: printf("%" PRId64, t); specifies decimal format for a 64-bit signed integer. Since the macros evaluate to a string literal, and the compiler concatenates adjacent string literals, the expression "%" PRId64 compiles to a single string.

Macros include:

Macro	Description
PRId32	Typically equivalent to I32d (Win32/Win64) or d
PRId64	Typically equivalent to I64d (Win32/Win64), lld (32-bit platforms) or ld (64-bit platforms)
PRIi32	Typically equivalent to I32i (Win32/Win64) or i
PRIi64	Typically equivalent to I64i (Win32/Win64), lli (32-bit platforms) or li (64-bit platforms)
PRIu32	Typically equivalent to I32u (Win32/Win64) or u
PRIu64	Typically equivalent to I64u (Win32/Win64), llu (32-bit platforms) or lu (64-bit platforms)
PRIx32	Typically equivalent to I32x (Win32/Win64) or x
PRIx64	Typically equivalent to I64x (Win32/Win64), llx (32-bit platforms) or lx (64-bit platforms)

=== Type field ===
The type field can be any of:

Text	Description
%	Output a literal % character; does not accept flags, width, precision or length fields
d, i	(signed) int formatted as decimal; %d and %i are synonymous except when used with scanf
u	unsigned int formatted as decimal.
f, F	double formatted as fixed-point; f and F only differs in how the strings for an infinite number or NaN are printed (inf, infinity and nan for f; INF, INFINITY and NAN for F)
e, E	double formatted as in exponential notation d.ddde±dd; E results in E rather than e to introduce the exponent; the exponent always contains at least two digits; if the value is zero, the exponent is 00; in Windows, the exponent contains three digits by default, e.g. 1.5e002, but this can be altered by Microsoft-specific _set_output_format function
g, G	double formatted as either fixed-point or exponential notation, whichever is more appropriate for its magnitude; g uses lower-case letters, G uses upper-case letters; this type differs slightly from fixed-point notation in that insignificant zeroes to the right of the decimal point are not included, and that the precision field specifies the total number of significant digits rather than the digits after the decimal; the decimal point is not included on whole numbers
x, X	unsigned int formatted as hexadecimal; x uses lower-case letters and X uses upper-case
o	unsigned int formatted as octal
s	null-terminated string
c	char
p	Pointer formatted in an implementation-defined way
a, A	double in hexadecimal notation, starting with 0x or 0X. a uses lower-case letters, A uses upper-case letters
n	Outputs nothing but writes the number of characters written so far into an integer pointer parameter; in Java this prints a newline

=== Custom data type formatting ===
A common way to handle formatting with a custom data type is to format the custom data type value into a string, then use the %s specifier to include the serialized value in a larger message.

Some printf-like functions allow extensions to the escape-character-based mini-language, thus allowing the programmer to use a specific formatting function for non-builtin types. One is the (now deprecated) glibc's register_printf_function(). However, it is rarely used due to the fact that it conflicts with static format string checking. Another is Vstr custom formatters, which allows adding multi-character format names.

Some applications (like the Apache HTTP Server) include their own printf-like function, and embed extensions into it. However these all tend to have the same problems that register_printf_function() has.

The Linux kernel printk function supports a number of ways to display kernel structures using the generic %p specification, by appending additional format characters. For example, %pI4 prints an IPv4 address in dotted-decimal form. This allows static format string checking (of the %p portion) at the expense of full compatibility with normal printf.

== Vulnerabilities ==
=== Format string attack ===
Extra value arguments are ignored, but if the format string has more format specifiers than value arguments passed, the behavior is undefined. For some C compilers, an extra format specifier results in consuming a value even though there isn't one which allows the format string attack. Generally, for C, arguments are passed on the stack. If too few arguments are passed, then printf can read past the end of the stack frame, thus allowing an attacker to read the stack.

Some compilers, like the GNU Compiler Collection, will statically check the format strings of printf-like functions and warn about problems (when using the flags -Wall or -Wformat). GCC will also warn about user-defined printf-style functions if the non-standard "format" __attribute__ is applied to the function.

=== Uncontrolled format string exploit ===
The format string is often a string literal, which allows static analysis of the function call. However, the format string can be the value of a variable, which allows for dynamic formatting but also a security vulnerability known as an uncontrolled format string exploit.

=== Memory write ===
Although an output function on the surface, printf allows writing to a memory location specified by an argument via %n. This functionality can be used for code injection attacks without violating control-flow integrity.

The %n format specifier also makes printf accidentally Turing-complete even with a well-formed set of arguments. A game of tic-tac-toe written in the format string is a winner of the 27th IOCCC.

== Related functions ==
=== Family ===
Variants of printf in the C standard library include:

fprintf
outputs to a file pointer instead of standard output. This "file" can still be stdout or stderr. There is a POSIX-extension dprintf that instead accepts an integer file descriptor.
sprintf
writes to a string buffer instead of standard output.
snprintf
provides a level of safety over sprintf since the caller provides a length n that is the length of the output buffer in bytes (including space for the trailing null character).
asprintf
provides for safety by accepting a string handle (char**) argument. The function allocates a buffer of sufficient size to contain the formatted text and outputs the buffer via the handle. This is a POSIX extension.

For each function of the family, including printf, there is also a variant that accepts a single va_list argument rather than a variable list of arguments. These variants start with "v", for example: vprintf, vfprintf, vsprintf.

For each function of the family, including the v versions, there is also a variant that operates on C-style wide characters. These variants replace the name "printf" with "wprintf", for example: fwprintf, vswprintf.

Generally, printf-like functions return the number of bytes output or a negative number to indicate failure.

The near-inverse function for printf is scanf, which accepts a very similar format string to parse an input.

=== Other contexts ===
The following list includes notable programming languages that provide (directly or via a standard library) functioning that is the same or similar to the C printf-like functions. Excluded are languages that use format strings that deviate from the style in this article (such as AMPL and Elixir), languages that inherit their implementation from the Java virtual machine (JVM) or other environment (such as Clojure and Scala), and languages that do not have a standard native printf implementation but have external libraries which emulate printf behavior (such as JavaScript).

- awk
- C
- C++
- D
- F#
- G
- GNU MathProg
- GNU Octave
- Go
- Haskell
- J
- Java (since version 1.5) and JVM languages
- Julia (via Printf standard library)
- Lua (string.format)
- Maple
- MATLAB
- Max (via the sprintf object)
- Objective-C
- OCaml (via Printf module)
- PARI/GP
- Perl
  - Raku (via printf, sprintf, and fmt)
- PHP
- Python (via % operator)
- R
- Red/System
- Ruby
- SQLite
- Tcl (via format command)
- Transact-SQL (via xp_sprintf)
- Vala (via print() and FileStream.printf())

== History ==
=== 1950s: Fortran ===
Early programming languages like Fortran used special statements with different syntax from other calculations to build formatting descriptions. In this example, the format is specified on line 601, and the PRINT (Note: According to the 1956 Fortran manual, the PRINT command prints on the attached printer. The manual also introduces the command WRITE OUTPUT TAPE that also uses the FORMAT statement to write on a tape unit.) command refers to it by line number:

      PRINT 601, IA, IB, AREA
 601  FORMAT (4H A= ,I5,5H  B= ,I5,8H  AREA= ,F10.2, 13H SQUARE UNITS)

Hereby:

- 4H indicates a string of 4 characters " A= " (H means Hollerith Field);
- I5 indicates an integer field of width 5;
- F10.2 indicates a floating-point field of width 10 with 2 digits after the decimal point.

An output with input arguments 100, 200, and 1500.25 might look like this:

 A=   100  B=   200  AREA=    1500.25 SQUARE UNITS

=== 1960s: BCPL and ALGOL 68 ===
In 1967, BCPL appeared. Its library included the writef routine which acted as a function call (instead of a special syntax). An example application looks like this:

WRITEF("%I2-QUEENS PROBLEM HAS %I5 SOLUTIONS*N", NUMQUEENS, COUNT)

Hereby:

- %I2 indicates an integer of width 2 (the order of the format specification's field width and type is reversed compared to C's printf);
- %I5 indicates an integer of width 5;
- *N is a BCPL language escape sequence representing a newline character (for which C uses the escape sequence \n).

ALGOL 68 also had a function api, but used special syntax for the format:

printf(($"Color "g", number1 "6d,", number2 "4zd,", hex "16r2d,", float "-d.2d,", unsigned value"-3d"."l$,
         "red", 123456, 89, BIN 255, 3.14, 250));

Using normal function syntax for the printing simplifies the language, and allows the printing to be implemented in the language itself. In most newer languages of that era I/O is not part of the syntax. However the format was usually not checked to see if it matched the type (or even the number) of values being printed.

=== 1970s: C ===
In 1973, printf was included as a C standard library routine as part of Version 4 Unix. They were included into the first C standard of 1989, ANSI C89 (ANSI X3.159-1989).

=== 1990s: Unix and POSIX ===
The %n$ notation is not present in the 1985 system V user manual, but is present in the 1996 version 4 of the System V Interface Definition. It is present in version 6 of the POSIX standard as a clearly-marked C extension ("CX").

=== 1990s: Shell command ===
In 1990, the printf command-line program, modeled after the C standard library function, was included with 4.3BSD-Reno. In 1991, a printf command was included with GNU shellutils (now part of GNU Core Utilities).

X/Open Portability Guide added the utility printf in Issue 4 (circa 1994); by then the %n$ notation was not present. The %n$ feature was added in Issue 8 of 2024, finally matching the POSIX C extension.

=== 2000s: Java ===
In 2004, Java 5.0 (1.5) released, which extended the class java.io.PrintStream, adding a method named printf() which functions analogously to printf() in C. Thus to print a formatted string to the standard output stream, one uses System.out.printf(). Java further introduced the method format to its string class java.lang.String.

=== 2000s: -Wformat safety ===
The need to do something about the range of problems resulting from lack of type safety has prompted attempts to make compilers printf-aware.

The -Wformat option of GNU Compiler Collection (GCC) allows compile time checks to printf calls, enabling the compiler to detect a subset of invalid calls (and issue either a warning or an error, terminating compilation, as set by other flags).

Because the compiler inspects printf format specifiers, this feature effectively extends static analysis in C to include formatting aspects.

== Replacement syntax ==
=== C++ ===
==== 1990s: iostream ====
C++ added input/output support using the << operator to avoid safety issues of printf. This used the type of the arguments to choose which code to execute to print them, avoiding the crashes that are possible with format strings. However, the syntax can be verbose (especially for setting options like precision), and printf remains available in C++ and is often used instead.

==== 2020s: std::fmt ====
C++20 added a new API which uses a string consisting of verbatim text and placeholders followed by the values to print. The format string uses curly braces instead of percent signs, based on the syntax used in the Python standard library:

std::format("The hex value of {} is {:x}.", name, value)

The recommended implementation is from Victor Zverovich's fmtlib which at compile time converts the string and argument types into an optimized formatting object, this is type-safe and syntax errors are detected at compile time. C++23 introduced the functions std::print() and std::println() which combined formatting and outputting, and is therefore a functional replacement for printf(). It is possible to make a translator from a printf %-string to the same formatting object and this could produce a type-safe printf, but this was also not added to the spec. No analogous scanf modernization has been introduced, though one has been proposed based on scnlib.

These functions (plus std::to_chars) can print floating point accurately using the least number of trailing digits possible, an ability long missing from printf. Another useful feature is that they ignore the locale.

== See also ==
- "Hello, World!" program – A basic example program first featured in The C Programming Language (the "K&R Book"), which in the C example uses printf to output the message "Hello, World!"
- Format (Common Lisp) – Function that interpolates text
- C standard library – Standard library for the C programming language
- Uncontrolled format string – Type of software vulnerability
- C++ input/output library – C++ input/output functionality in the standard library
- printf debugging – Fixing defects in an engineered system
- printf (Unix) – Shell command for formatting and outputting text; like printf() library function
- printk – Printf-like function for the Linux kernel
- scanf – Control parameter used in programming languages
- string interpolation – Replacing placeholders in a string with values
