= Scanf =

Control parameter used in programming languages

scanf, short for scan formatted, is a C standard library function that reads and parses text from standard input.

The function accepts a format string parameter that specifies the layout of input text. The function parses input text and loads values into variables based on data type. The format string is almost identical to the form used by the printf, which provides formatted output (templating). scanf and printf are practically inverse functions of each other.

There are companion functions that read from a file (fscanf) or an existing string (sscanf).

Similar functions, with other names, predate C, such as readf in ALGOL 68.

== History ==
Mike Lesk's portable input/output library, including scanf, officially became part of Unix in Version 7. This would be inherited into ANSI C89, the first C standard.

For reading input, C++ typically uses std::cin, while Java uses a class java.util.Scanner. A modernization of ::printf() was introduced to C++, based on fmtlib, which added std::format() (in C++20) and std::print() and std::println() (in C++23). However, no analogous ::scanf() modernization has been introduced, though one has been proposed based on scnlib.

== Usage ==
The scanf function reads input for numbers and other datatypes from standard input.

The following C code reads a variable number of unformatted decimal integers from standard input and prints each of them out on separate lines:

#include <stdio.h>

int main(void) {
    int n;
    while (scanf("%d", &n)) {
        printf("%d\n", n);
    }
    return 0;
}

For input:

456 123 789 456 12
456 1
      2378

The output is:

456
123
789
456
12
456
1
2378

To print out a word:

#include <stdio.h>

int main(void) {
    char word[20];
    if (scanf("%19s", word)) {
        puts(word);
    }
    return 0;
}

No matter what the data type the programmer wants the program to read, the arguments (such as &n above) must be pointers pointing to memory. Otherwise, the function will not perform correctly because it will be attempting to overwrite the wrong sections of memory, rather than pointing to the memory location of the variable you are attempting to get input for.

In the last example an address-of operator (&) is not used for the argument: as word is the name of an array of char, as such it is (in all contexts in which it evaluates to an address) equivalent to a pointer to the first element of the array. While the expression &word would numerically evaluate to the same value, semantically, it has an entirely different meaning in that it stands for the address of the whole array rather than an element of it. This fact needs to be kept in mind when assigning scanf output to strings.

As scanf is designated to read only from standard input, many programming languages with interfaces, such as PHP, have derivatives such as sscanf and fscanf but not scanf itself.

== Format string specifications ==
The formatting placeholders in scanf are more or less the same as that in printf, its reverse function. As in printf, the POSIX extension n$ is defined.

There are rarely constants (i.e., characters that are not formatting placeholders) in a format string, mainly because a program is usually not designed to read known data, although scanf does accept these if explicitly specified. The exception is one or more whitespace characters, which discards all whitespace characters in the input.

Some of the most commonly used placeholders follow:

- %a : Scan a floating-point number in its hexadecimal notation.
- %d : Scan an integer as a signed decimal number.
- %i : Scan an integer as a signed number. Similar to %d, but interprets the number as hexadecimal when preceded by 0x and octal when preceded by 0. For example, the string 031 would be read as 31 using %d, and 25 using %i. The flag h in %hi indicates conversion to a short and hh conversion to a char.
- %u : Scan for decimal unsigned int (Note that in the C99 standard the input value minus sign is optional, so if a minus sign is read, no errors will arise and the result will be the two's complement of a negative number, likely a very large value. See strtoul().) Correspondingly, %hu scans for an unsigned short and %hhu for an unsigned char.
- %f : Scan a floating-point number in normal (fixed-point) notation.
- %g, %G : Scan a floating-point number in either normal or exponential notation. %g uses lower-case letters and %G uses upper-case.
- %x, %X : Scan an integer as an unsigned hexadecimal number.
- %o : Scan an integer as an octal number.
- %s : Scan a character string. The scan terminates at whitespace. A null character is stored at the end of the string, which means that the buffer supplied must be at least one character longer than the specified input length.
- %c : Scan a character (char). No null character is added.
- whitespace: Any whitespace characters trigger a scan for zero or more whitespace characters. The number and type of whitespace characters do not need to match in either direction.
- %lf : Scan as a double floating-point number. "Float" format with the "long" specifier.
- %Lf : Scan as a long double floating-point number. "Float" format the "long long" specifier.
- %n : Nothing is expected. The number of characters consumed thus far from the input is stored through the next pointer, which must be a pointer to int. This is not a conversion and does not increase the count returned by the function.

The above can be used in compound with numeric modifiers and the l, L modifiers which stand for "long" and "long long" in between the percent symbol and the letter. There can also be numeric values between the percent symbol and the letters, preceding the long modifiers if any, that specifies the number of characters to be scanned. An optional asterisk (*) right after the percent symbol denotes that the datum read by this format specifier is not to be stored in a variable. No argument behind the format string should be included for this dropped variable.

The ff modifier in printf is not present in scanf, causing differences between modes of input and output. The ll and hh modifiers are not present in the C90 standard, but are present in the C99 standard.

An example of a format string is

"%7d%s %c%lf"

The above format string scans the first seven characters as a decimal integer, then reads the remaining as a string until a space, newline, or tab is found, then consumes whitespace until the first non-whitespace character is found, then consumes that character, and finally scans the remaining characters as a double. Therefore, a robust program must check whether the scanf call succeeded and take appropriate action. If the input was not in the correct format, the erroneous data will still be on the input stream and must be discarded before new input can be read. An alternative method, which avoids this, is to use fgets and then examine the string read in. The last step can be done by sscanf, for example.

In the case of the many float type characters a, e, f, g, many implementations choose to collapse most into the same parser. Microsoft MSVCRT does it with e, f, g, while glibc does so with all four.

ISO C99 includes the inttypes.h header file that includes a number of macros for use in platform-independent scanf coding. These must be outside double-quotes, e.g. scanf("%" SCNd64 "\n", &t);

Example macros include:

Macro	Description
SCNd32	Typically equivalent to I32d (Win32/Win64) or d
SCNd64	Typically equivalent to I64d (Win32/Win64), lld (32-bit platforms) or ld (64-bit platforms)
SCNi32	Typically equivalent to I32i (Win32/Win64) or i
SCNi64	Typically equivalent to I64i (Win32/Win64), lli (32-bit platforms) or li (64-bit platforms)
SCNu32	Typically equivalent to I32u (Win32/Win64) or u
SCNu64	Typically equivalent to I64u (Win32/Win64), llu (32-bit platforms) or lu (64-bit platforms)
SCNx32	Typically equivalent to I32x (Win32/Win64) or x
SCNx64	Typically equivalent to I64x (Win32/Win64), llx (32-bit platforms) or lx (64-bit platforms)

== Vulnerabilities ==
scanf is vulnerable to format string attacks. Great care should be taken to ensure that the formatting string includes limitations for string and array sizes. In most cases the input string size from a user is arbitrary and cannot be determined before the scanf function is executed. This means that %s placeholders without length specifiers are inherently insecure and exploitable for buffer overflows. Another potential problem is to allow dynamic formatting strings, for example formatting strings stored in configuration files or other user-controlled files. In this case the allowed input length of string sizes cannot be specified unless the formatting string is checked beforehand and limitations are enforced. Related to this are additional or mismatched formatting placeholders which do not match the actual vararg list. These placeholders might be partially extracted from the stack or contain undesirable or even insecure pointers, depending on the particular implementation of varargs.

== See also ==
- C programming language
- Uncontrolled format string
- Printf
- String interpolation
