= Uniform function call syntax =

Programming language feature

Uniform function call syntax (UFCS) or uniform call syntax (UCS) is a programming language feature in D, Nim, Koka, Effekt,, Lean, and other programming languages, that allows any function to be called using the syntax for method calls (as in object-oriented programming), by using the receiver as the first parameter and the given arguments as the remaining parameters. The same technique is used in the AviSynth scripting language under the name "OOP notation".

UFCS is particularly useful when function calls are chained (behaving similar to pipes, or the various dedicated operators available in functional languages for passing values through a series of expressions). It allows free functions to fill a role similar to extension methods in some other languages. Another benefit of the syntax is related to completion systems in IDEs, which use type information to show a list of available functions, dependent on the context. When the programmer starts with an argument, the set of potentially applicable functions is greatly narrowed down, aiding discoverability.

== Examples ==
=== D programming language ===
int first(int[] arr)
{
    return arr[0];
}

int[] addone(int[] arr)
{
    int[] result;
    foreach (value; arr) {
        result ~= value + 1;
    }
    return result;
}

void main()
{
    auto a = [0, 1, 2, 3];

    // all the following are correct and equivalent
    int b = first(a);
    int c = a.first();

    // chaining
    int[] e = a.addone().addone();
}

=== Nim programming language ===
type Vector = tuple[x, y: int]

proc add(a, b: Vector): Vector =
  (a.x + b.x, a.y + b.y)

let
  v1 = (x: -1, y: 4)
  v2 = (x: 5, y: -2)

  # all the following are correct
  v3 = add(v1, v2)
  v4 = v1.add(v2)
  v5 = v1.add(v2).add(v4)

== C++ proposal ==
Proposals for a unification of member function and free function calling syntax have been discussed from the early years of C++ standardization. Glassborow (2004) proposed a uniform calling syntax (UCS), allowing specially annotated free functions to be called with member function notation. In 2016 it was proposed a second time for addition to C++ by Bjarne Stroustrup and Herb Sutter, to reduce the ambiguous decision between writing free functions and member functions, to simplify the writing of templated code. Many programmers are tempted to write member functions to get the benefits of the member function syntax (e.g. "dot-autocomplete" to list member functions); however, this leads to excessive coupling between classes. This was again, in 2023, proposed by Herb Sutter claiming new information and insights, as well as an experimental implementation in the cppfront compiler.

== Rust usage of the term ==
Until 2018, it was common to use this term when actually referring to qualified/explicit path syntax and most commonly the fully qualified path syntax: because it is possible to have several traits defining the same method implemented on the same struct, a mechanism is needed to disambiguate which trait should be used. Member functions can also be used as free functions through a qualified (namespaced) path. The term UFCS is incorrect for these uses, as it allows using methods as (namespaced) free functions, but not using free functions as methods.

== See also ==
- Trait (computer programming)
- Interface (computer programming)
- Go (programming language), another language with a more open philosophy to methods
- Loose coupling
- Duck typing
- Method chaining
