= New and delete (C++) =

C++ programming keywords for dynamic memory allocation

In the C++ programming language, new and delete are a pair of language constructs that perform dynamic memory allocation, object construction and object destruction.

== Overview ==
Except for a form called the "placement new", the new operator denotes a request for memory allocation on a process's heap. If sufficient memory is available, new initialises the memory, calling object constructors if necessary, and returns the address to the newly allocated and initialised memory. A new request, in its simplest form, looks as follows:

T* p = new T;
T* p = new T(); // zero-initialises primitives

where p is a pointer of type T (or some other type to which a T pointer can be assigned, such as a superclass of T). The default constructor for T, if any, is called to construct a T instance in the allocated memory buffer.

If not enough memory is available in the free store for an object of type T, the new request indicates failure by throwing an exception of type std::bad_alloc. This removes the need to explicitly check the result of an allocation.

The deallocation counterpart of new is delete, which first calls the destructor (if any) on its argument and then returns the memory allocated by new back to the free store. Every call to new must be matched by a call to delete; failure to do so causes a memory leak.

new syntax has several variants that allow finer control over memory allocation and object construction. A function call-like syntax is used to call a different constructor than the default one and pass it arguments, e.g.,

T* p = new T(argument);

calls a single-argument T constructor instead of the default constructor when initializing the newly allocated buffer.

A different variant allocates and initialises arrays of objects rather than single objects:

T* p = new T[N];

This requests a memory buffer from the free store that is large enough to hold a contiguous array of N objects of type T, and calls the default constructor on each element of the array.

Memory allocated with the new[] must be deallocated with the delete[] operator, rather than delete. Using the inappropriate form results in undefined behavior. C++ compilers are not required to generate a diagnostic message for using the wrong form.

The C++11 standard specifies an additional syntax,

constexpr size_t N = /* some length */;

T* p = new T[N] {initializer1, ..., initializerN};

that initializes each p[i] to initializer_{i+1}.

Java and C# have the new operator (which calls the class constructor), but not the delete operator. Java does not have destructors. C# has destructors, but they are seldomly used and cannot be called through the delete operator.

public class Person {
    private String name;
    private int age;

    public Person(String name, int age) {
        this.name = name;
        this.age = age;
    }
}

Person p = new Person("Alice", 30);

Although in Rust there are no object-oriented style constructors, the convention is to name a factory method for instantiating a struct new (usually returning Self), while manual deletion is done by implementing std::ops::Drop.

JavaScript and TypeScript have the operators new and delete. However, while new is used for calling the class constructor, delete does not call a destructor (as destructors do not exist in JavaScript or TypeScript). Instead, delete removes a property from an object.

class User {
    name: string;
    age?: number; // marked optional to allow delete

    constructor(name: string, age?: number) {
        this.name = name;
        this.age = age;
    }
}

let user: User = new User("Alice", 30);

delete user.age; // No TypeScript error

// Output: { name: "Alice" }
console.log(user);

In C++, delete is also used to disable compiler-generated methods, such as default constructors. In C++26, it is possible to provide a reason for its removal.

class NonCopyable {
public:
    NonCopyable() = default;
    NonCopyable(const NonCopyable&) = delete("No copy constructor");
    NonCopyable& operator=(const NonCopyable&) = delete("No copy assignment");
};

=== Error handling ===
If new cannot find sufficient memory to service an allocation request, it can report its error in three distinct ways. Firstly, the ISO C++ standard allows programs to register a custom function called a "new_handler" with the C++ runtime, through the std::set_new_handler() function; if it does, then this function is called whenever new encounters an error. The new_handler may attempt to make more memory available, or terminate the program if it can't. Note that std::new_handler is defined precisely as void(*)().

If no new_handler is installed, new instead throws an exception of type std::bad_alloc. Thus, the program does not need to check the value of the returned pointer, as is the habit in C; if no exception was thrown, the allocation succeeded.

The third method of error handling is provided by the variant form new(std::nothrow), which specifies that no exception should be thrown; instead, a null pointer is returned to signal an allocation error.

=== Overloading ===
The new operator can be overloaded so that specific types (classes) use custom memory allocation algorithms for their instances. For example, the following is a variant of the singleton pattern where the first new Singleton() call allocates an instance and all subsequent calls return this same instance:

import std;

class Singleton {
private:
    static void* instance = nullptr;
    static size_t refcount = 0;
public:
    static void* operator new(size_t size) {
        if (!instance) {
            instance = std::malloc(size);
        }
        ++refcount;
        return instance;
    }

    static void operator delete([[maybe_unused]] void* p) noexcept {
        if (--refcount == 0) {
            std::free(instance);
            instance = nullptr;
        }
    }
};

This feature was available from early on in C++'s history, although the specific overloading mechanism changed. It was added to the language because object-oriented C++ programs tended to allocate many small objects with new, which internally used the C allocator (see § Relation to malloc and free); that, however, was optimized for the fewer and larger allocations performed by typical C programs. Stroustrup reported that in early applications, the C function malloc() was "the most common performance bottleneck in real systems", with programs spending up to 50% of their time in this function.

== Relation to malloc and free ==
Since standard C++ subsumes the C standard library, the C dynamic memory allocation routines malloc(), calloc(), realloc() and free() are also available to C++ programmers. The use of these routines is discouraged for most uses, since they do not perform object initialization and destruction. new and delete were, in fact, introduced in the first version of C++ (then called "C with Classes") to avoid the necessity of manual object initialization.

In contrast to the C routines, which allow growing or shrinking an allocated array with realloc(), it is not possible to change the size of a memory buffer allocated by new[]. The C++ standard library instead provides a dynamic array (collection) that can be extended or reduced in its std::vector template class.

The C++ standard does not specify any relation between new/delete and the C memory allocation routines, but new and delete are typically implemented as wrappers around malloc() and free(). Mixing the two families of operations, e.g., free()-ing new-ly allocated memory or delete-ing malloc()-ed memory, causes undefined behavior and in practice can lead to various catastrophic results such as failure to release locks and thus deadlock.

== See also ==
- Allocator (C++)
- Exception handling
- Memory pool
- Pointer (computer programming)
- Resource Acquisition Is Initialization (RAII)
- Smart pointers
- Placement syntax
