= ParaSail (programming language) =

- Logo for ParaSail Programming Language
- Paradigm: compiled, concurrent, imperative, structured, object-oriented
- Designed by: S. Tucker Taft
- Developer: AdaCore
- First appeared: 2009; 16 years ago
- Stable release: 9.3 / 6 June 2021; 4 years ago
- Typing discipline: strong, static
- Platform: x86
- OS: Linux, macOS, Windows
- License: GPL v3
- Filename extensions: .psi, .psl
- Website: parasail-lang.org

Major implementations
- psli, pslc

Influenced by
- Modula, Ada, Pascal, ML

Influenced
- Nim

Parallel Specification and Implementation Language (ParaSail) is an object-oriented parallel programming language. Its design and ongoing implementation is described in a blog and on its official website.

ParaSail uses a pointer-free programming model, where objects can grow and shrink, and value semantics are used for assignment. It has no global garbage collected heap. Instead, region-based memory management is used throughout. Types can be recursive, so long as the recursive components are declared optional. There are no global variables, no parameter aliasing, and all subexpressions of an expression can be evaluated in parallel. Assertions, preconditions, postconditions, class invariants, etc., are part of the standard syntax, using a Hoare-like notation. Any possible race conditions are detected at compile time.

Initial design of ParaSail began in September 2009, by S. Tucker Taft.

Both an interpreter using the ParaSail virtual machine, and an LLVM-based ParaSail compiler are available. Work stealing is used for scheduling ParaSail's light-weight threads. The latest version can be downloaded from the ParaSail website.

== Description ==
The syntax of ParaSail is similar to Modula, but with a class-and-interface-based object-oriented programming model more similar to Java or C#.

More recently, the parallel constructs of ParaSail have been adapted to other syntaxes, to produce Java-like, Python-like, and Ada-like parallel languages, dubbed, respectively, Javallel, Parython, and Sparkel (named after the Ada subset SPARK on which it is based). Compilers and interpreters for these languages are included with the ParaSail implementation.

== Examples ==
The following is a Hello world program in ParaSail:

func Hello_World(var IO) is
    IO.Println("Hello, World");
end func Hello_World;

The following is an interface to a basic map module:

interface BMap<Key_Type is Ordered<>; Element_Type is Assignable<>> is
    op "[]"() -> BMap;  // Create an empty map

    func Insert(var BMap; Key : Key_Type; Value : Element_Type);
    func Find(BMap; Key : Key_Type) -> optional Element_Type;
    func Delete(var BMap; Key : Key_Type);
    func Count(BMap) -> Univ_Integer;
end interface BMap;

Here is a possible implementation of this map module, using a binary tree:

class BMap is

    interface Binary_Node<> is
      // A simple "concrete" binary node module
        var Left : optional Binary_Node;
        var Right : optional Binary_Node;
        const Key : Key_Type;
        var Value : optional Element_Type;  // null means deleted
    end interface Binary_Node;

    var Tree : optional Binary_Node;
    var Count := 0;

  exports

    op "[]"() -> BMap is  // Create an empty map
        return (Tree => null, Count => 0);
    end op "[]";

    func Insert(var BMap; Key : Key_Type; Value : Element_Type) is
      // Search for Key, overwrite if found, insert new node if not
        for M => BMap.Tree loop
            if M is null then
                // Not already in the map; add it
                M := (Key => Key, Value => Value, Left => null, Right => null);
                BMap.Count += 1;
            else
               case Key =? M.Key of
                 [#less] =>
                   continue loop with M.Left;
                 [#greater] =>
                   continue loop with M.Right;
                 [#equal] =>
                   // Key is already in the map;
                   // bump count if Value was null;
                   if M.Value is null then
                       BMap.Count += 1;
                   end if;
                   // in any case overwrite the Value field
                   M.Value := Value;
                   return;
               end case;
            end if;
        end loop;
    end func Insert;

    func Find(BMap; Key : Key_Type) -> optional Element_Type is
      // Search for Key, return associated Value if present, or null otherwise
        for M => BMap.Tree while M not null loop
            case Key =? M.Key of
              [#less] =>
                continue loop with M.Left;
              [#greater] =>
                continue loop with M.Right;
              [#equal] =>
                // Found it; return the value
                return M.Value;
            end case;
        end loop;
        // Not found in BMap
        return null;
    end func Find;

    func Delete(var BMap; Key : Key_Type) is
      // Search for Key; delete associated node if found
        for M => BMap.Tree while M not null loop
            case Key =? M.Key of
              [#less] =>
                continue loop with M.Left;
              [#greater] =>
                continue loop with M.Right;
              [#equal] =>
                // Found it; if at most one subtree is non-null, overwrite
                // it; otherwise, set its value field to null
                // (to avoid a more complex re-balancing).
                if M.Left is null then
                    // Move right subtree into M
                    M <== M.Right;
                elsif M.Right is null then
                    // Move left subtree into M
                    M <== M.Left;
                else
                    // Cannot immediately reclaim node;
                    // set value field to null instead.
                    M.Value := null;
                end if;
                // Decrement count
                BMap.Count -= 1;
            end case;
        end loop;
        // Not found in the map
    end func Delete;

    func Count(BMap) -> Univ_Integer is
      // Return count of number of items in map
        return BMap.Count;
    end func Count;

end class BMap;

Here is a simple test program for the BMap module:

import PSL::Core::Random;
import BMap;
func Test_BMap(Num : Univ_Integer; Seed : Univ_Integer) is
    // Test the Binary-Tree-based Map
    var Ran : Random := Start(Seed);  // Start a random-number sequence

    // Declare a map from integers to strings
    var M : BMap<Key_Type => Univ_Integer, Element_Type => Univ_String>;

    M := [];  // Initialize the map to the empty map

    for I in 1..Num*2 forward loop  // Add elements to the map
        const Key := Next(Ran) mod Num + 1;
        const Val := "Val" | To_String(I);
        Println("About to insert " | Key | " => " | Val);
        Insert(M, Key, Val);
    end loop;
    Println("Count = " | Count(M));

    for I in 1..Num loop // Search for elements in the map
        const Key := Next(Ran) mod Num + 1;
        Println("Looking for " | Key | ", found " | Find(M, Key));
    end loop;

    for I in 1..Num/3 loop  // Delete some elements from the map
        const Key := Next(Ran) mod Num + 1;
        Println("About to delete " | Key);
        Delete(M, Key);
    end loop;
    Println("Count = " | Count(M));

    for I in 1..Num forward loop  // Search again for elements in the map
        Println("Looking for " | I | ", found " | Find(M, I));
    end loop;

end func Test_BMap;
