= X86 memory models =

Set of memory models of the x86 CPU

In computing, the x86 memory models are a set of six different memory models of the x86 CPU operating in real mode which control how the segment registers are used and the default size of pointers.

== Memory segmentation ==
Four registers are used to refer to four segments on the 16-bit x86 segmented memory architecture. DS (data segment), CS (code segment), SS (stack segment), and ES (extra segment). Another 16-bit register can act as an offset into a given segment, and so a logical address on this platform is written segment:offset, typically in hexadecimal notation. In real mode, in order to calculate the physical address of a byte of memory, the hardware shifts the contents of the appropriate segment register 4 bits left (effectively multiplying by 16), and then adds the offset.

For example, the logical address 7522:F139 yields the 20-bit physical address:

	75220
+	F139
	84359

Note that this process leads to aliasing of memory, such that any given physical address has up to 4096 corresponding logical addresses. This complicates the comparison of pointers to different segments.

== Pointer sizes ==
Pointer formats are known as near, far, or huge. These examples each load two adjacent integers into AX and DX from an address stored at [reg].

- Near pointers are 16-bit offsets within the reference segment, i.e. DS for data and CS for code. They are the fastest pointers, but are limited to point to 64 KB of memory (to the associated segment of the data type). Near pointers can be held in registers (typically BX, SI, and DI).

    mov bx, word [reg]
    mov ax, word [bx]
    mov dx, word [bx+2]

- Far pointers are 32-bit pointers containing a segment and an offset. To use them the segment register ES is used by using the instruction LES Reg, dword ptr [mem]. They may reference up to 1024 KiB of memory. Note that pointer arithmetic (addition and subtraction) does not modify the segment portion of the pointer, only its offset. Operations which exceed the bounds of zero or 65535 (0xFFFF) will undergo modulo 64K operation just as any normal 16-bit operation. For example, if the segment register is set to 0x5000 and the offset is being incremented, the moment this counter offset becomes (0x10000), the resulting absolute address will roll over to 0x5000:0000.

    les bx,dword [reg]
    mov ax,word [es:bx]
    mov dx,word [es:bx+2]

- Huge pointers are essentially far pointers, but are (mostly) normalized every time they are modified so that they have the highest possible segment for that address. This is very slow but allows the pointer to point to multiple segments (i.e. to span more than 64 KB), and allows for accurate pointer comparisons, as if the platform were a flat memory model: It forbids the aliasing of memory as described above, so two huge pointers that reference the same memory location are always equal.

    les bx,dword [reg]
    mov ax,word [es:bx]
    add bx,2
    test bx,0xfff0
    jz lbl
    sub bx,0x10
    mov dx,es
    inc dx
    mov es,dx
 lbl:
    mov dx,word [es:bx]

In reality, a compiler may optimize the above Huge pointer code using no branches. This version decrements the segment unconditionally and to compensate, a segment length (0x10) is added to BX. Unlike the previous Huge example, this version does not require the segment:offset to be normalized.

    les bx,dword [reg]
    mov ax,word [es:bx]
    mov dx,es
    dec dx
    mov es,dx
    mov dx,word [es:bx+(2+0x10)]

== Memory models ==
The memory models are:

Model	Data	Code	Definition
Tiny	near		CS=DS=SS=ES
Small	near	near	DS=SS
Medium	near	far	DS=SS, multiple code segments
Compact	far	near	single code segment, multiple data segments
Large	far	far	multiple code and data segments
Huge	huge	far	multiple code and data segments; single array may be >64 KB

Stack is always limited to at most 64 KB.

== Other platforms ==
In protected mode a segment cannot be both writable and executable. Therefore, when implementing the Tiny memory model the code segment register must point to the same physical address and have the same limit as the data segment register. This defeated one of the features of the 80286, which makes sure data segments are never executable and code segments are never writable (which means that self-modifying code is never allowed). However, on the 80386, with its paged memory management unit it is possible to protect individual memory pages against writing.

Memory models are not limited to 16-bit programs. It is possible to use segmentation in 32-bit protected mode as well (resulting in 48-bit pointers) and there exist C language compilers which support that. However segmentation in 32-bit mode does not allow to access a larger address space than what a single segment would cover, unless some segments are not always present in memory and the linear address space is just used as a cache over a larger segmented virtual space.

=== x86-64 ===
On the x86-64 platform, a total of seven memory models exist, as the majority of symbol references are only 32 bits wide, and if the addresses are known at link time (as opposed to position-independent code). This does not affect the pointers used, which are always flat 64-bit pointers, but only how values that have to be accessed via symbols can be placed.

== See also ==
- Protected mode

== Bibliography ==
- Turbo C++ Version 3.0 User's Guide. Borland International, Copyright 1992.
