= The C++ Programming Language =

Computer programming book by Stroustrup

- Cover of the fourth edition.
- Author: Bjarne Stroustrup
- Cover artist: Brian Gakeadumele
- Language: English
- Subject: C++
- Publisher: Addison–Wesley
- Publication date: October 14, 1985 (1st edition); 1991 (2nd); 1997 (3rd); 2000 (special); 2013 (4th)
- ISBN: 020112078X (1st); ISBN 0201539926 (2nd); ISBN 0201889544 (3rd); ISBN 0201700735 (sp.); ISBN 0321563840 (4th)
- OCLC: 59193992
- Dewey Decimal: 005.13/3 19
- LC Class: QA76.73.C153 S77 1986

The C++ Programming Language is a computer programming book first published on October 14, 1985. It was the first book to describe the C++ programming language, written by the language's creator, Bjarne Stroustrup. In the absence of an official standard, the book served for several years as the de facto documentation for the evolving C++ language, until the release of the ISO/IEC 14882:1998: Programming Language C++ standard on 1 September 1998. As the standard further evolved with the standardization of language and library extensions and with the publication of technical corrigenda, later editions of the book were updated to incorporate the new changes.

== History ==
The first edition of The C++ Programming Language was published in 1985. As C++ evolved, a second edition was published in July 1991, reflecting the changes made.

The third edition of the book was first published on 30 June 1997; a hardcover version of the third edition, with two new appendices, was later published as The C++ Programming Language: Special Edition on 11 February 2000. Both the softcover third edition and the hardcover “special edition” have since undergone several reprintings, with corrections.

C++ Solutions (ISBN 0-201-30965-3) is a companion book to the third edition of The C++ Programming Language. It contains solutions to selected exercises of The C++ Programming Language.

The fourth edition of the book, which incorporates C++11, was released on May 19, 2013.

== See also ==
- The C Programming Language
- List of computer science journals and List of software programming journals
- List of computer books
