= Boilerplate code =

Code that has to be included in many places with little or no alteration

In computer programming, boilerplate code, or simply boilerplate, are sections of code that are repeated in multiple places with little to no variation. When using languages that are considered verbose, the programmer must write a lot of boilerplate code to accomplish only minor functionality.

The need for boilerplate can be reduced through high-level mechanisms such as metaprogramming (which has the computer automatically write the needed boilerplate code or insert it at compile time), convention over configuration (which provides good default values, reducing the need to specify program details in every project) and model-driven engineering (which uses models and model-to-code generators, eliminating the need for manual boilerplate code).

It is also possible to move boilerplate code to an abstract class so that it can be inherited by any number of concrete classes. Another option would be to move it into a subroutine so that it can be called instead of being duplicated.

== Origin ==
The term arose from the newspaper business. Columns and other pieces that were distributed by print syndicates were sent to subscribing newspapers in the form of prepared printing plates. Because of their resemblance to the metal plates used in the making of boilers, they became known as "boiler plates", and their resulting text—"boilerplate text". As the stories that were distributed by boiler plates were usually "fillers" rather than "serious" news, the term became synonymous with unoriginal, repeated text.

A related term is bookkeeping code, referring to code that is not part of the business logic but is interleaved with it in order to keep data structures updated or handle secondary aspects of the program.

== Preamble ==
One form of boilerplate consists of declarations which, while not part of the program logic or the language's essential syntax, are added to the start of a source file as a matter of custom. The following Perl example demonstrates boilerplate:

#!/usr/bin/env perl
use warnings;
use strict;

The first line is a shebang, which identifies the file as a Perl script that can be executed directly on the command line on Unix/Linux systems. The other two are pragmas turning on warnings and strict mode, which are mandated by fashionable Perl programming style.

This next example is a C/C++ programming language boilerplate, #include guard.

#ifndef MYINTERFACE_H
#define MYINTERFACE_H

...

#endif

This checks, and sets up, a global flag to tell the compiler whether the file myinterface.h has already been included. As many interdepending files may be involved in the compilation of a module, this avoids processing the same header multiple times, (which would lead to errors due to multiple definitions with the same name).

== In Java and similar platforms ==
In Java programs, DTO classes are often provided with methods for getting and setting instance variables. The definitions of these methods can frequently be regarded as boilerplate. Although the code will vary from one class to another, it is sufficiently stereotypical in structure that it would be better generated automatically than written by hand. For example, in the following Java class representing a pet, almost all the code is boilerplate except for the declarations of Pet, name, and owner:

=== Java ===
public class Pet {
    private String name;
    private Person owner;

    public Pet(String name, Person owner) {
        this.name = name;
        this.owner = owner;
    }

    public String getName() {
        return name;
    }

    public void setName(String name) {
        this.name = name;
    }

    public Person getOwner() {
        return owner;
    }

    public void setOwner(Person owner) {
        this.owner = owner;
    }
}

Most of the boilerplate in this example exists to fulfill requirements of JavaBeans. If the variables name and owner were declared as public, the accessor and mutator methods would not be needed.

In Java 14, record classes were added to fight with this issue.

To reduce the amount of boilerplate, many frameworks have been developed, e.g. Lombok for Java. The same code as above is auto-generated by Lombok using Java annotations, which is a form of metaprogramming:

@AllArgsConstructor
@Getter
@Setter
public class Pet {
    private String name;
    private Person owner;
}

=== Scala ===
In some other programming languages it may be possible to achieve the same thing with less boilerplate, when the language has built-in support for such common constructs. For example, the equivalent of the above Java code can be expressed in Scala using just one line of code:

case class Pet(var name: String, var owner: Person)

=== C / C++ ===
An include guard:

#ifndef MYINTERFACE_H
#define MYINTERFACE_H

...

#endif

=== C# ===
Or in C# using automatic properties with compiler generated backing fields:

public class Pet
{
    public string Name { get; set; }
    public Person Owner { get; set; }
}

Starting with C# 9.0 there is an opportunity to use Records which generate classes with Properties automatically:

public record Pet(string Name, Person Owner);

== HTML ==
In HTML, the following boilerplate is used as a basic empty template and is present in most web pages:

<!DOCTYPE html>
<html lang="en">
<head>
  <meta charset="UTF-8"/>
  <title>Test</title>
</head>
<body>

</body>
</html>

The WHATWG HTML Living Standard defines that the <html>, <head> and <body> tags may be safely omitted under most circumstances. The <meta charset="UTF-8"> tag is technically redundant when coming directly from a web server configured to send the character encoding in an HTTP header, though it becomes useful when the HTML response is saved in an .html file, cache, or web archive. Google's HTML/CSS style guide recommends that all optional tags be omitted, resulting in much less boilerplate. The World Wide Web Consortium states that the element <title> must not be empty:

<!DOCTYPE html>
<title>Test</title>

== See also ==
- Directive (programming) – Language construct that specifies how a compiler should process its input
- General-purpose macro processor – Macro processor that is not tied to a particular language or piece of software
- "Hello, World!" program – Traditional first example of a computer programming language
- Library (computing) – Collection of resources used to develop a computer program
- Macro (computer science) – Rule for substituting a set input with a set output
- Preprocessor – Program that processes input for another program
- Scaffold (programming) – Code generation technique or a project generation technique
- Snippet (programming) – Small amount of source code used for productivity
- Template processor – Software using templates to produce documents
- Web template system – System in web publishing
