= Modules (C++) =

Modular translation unit in C++

Modules in C++ are a feature added in C++20 implementing modular programming as a modern alternative to precompiled headers. A module in C++ comprises a single translation unit. Like header files and implementation files, a module can contain declarations and definitions, but differ from precompiled headers in that they do not require the preprocessor directive #include, but rather are accessed using the keyword import. A module must be declared using the keyword module to indicate that the translation unit is a module. A module, once compiled, is stored as a built module interface (BMI) file which behaves similarly to a .pch (precompiled header) file. Module symbols and imports are resolved at the compilation stage, not the linking stage.

Modules most commonly have the extension .cppm (primarily common within Clang and GCC toolchains), though some alternative extensions include .ixx and .mxx (more common in Microsoft/MSVC toolchains), or even the traditional C++ extension .cpp.

Though the standard C language does not have modules, dialects of C allow for modules, such as Clang C. However, the syntax and semantics of Clang C modules differ from C++ modules significantly.

== History ==
Prior to the conception of modules, C++ relied on the system of headers and source files. Precompiled headers existed and were similar to modules as snapshots of translation units easier to parse by the compiler and thus providing faster compilation, but did not have the same laws of encapsulation as modules.

The first proposals for C++ modules were proposed in 2006 by Daveed Vandevoorde. These modules were based on those of Modula-2, with the goal of improving build times for large projects and providing better encapsulation for implementation. The original proposal proposed directly equating modules and namespaces, however subsequent revisions would make modules and namespaces orthogonal, a design choice that would remain in the final version. Vandevoorde additionally proposed plugins, which essentially were a feature to load dynamic libraries at runtime; a new type, std::plugin, would be returned by a std::attach() function which loaded a plugin (corresponding to a file), and unloaded by another std::plugin() function.

Modules, after a redesign, were again proposed in 2012 for inclusion to C++14, but underwent extensive revisions and yet an entire redesign until the modern form was accepted into C++20; despite this, modules faced low initial adoption as few toolchains provided full support for them. Prior, Microsoft created its own experimental modules implementation (which is now deprecated). Although modules were added in C++20, a standard library module was not added until C++23.

== Main uses ==
Modules provide the benefits of precompiled headers with faster compilation than #included traditional headers, as well as faster processing during the linking phase. This is because modules are not handled by the C preprocessor during the preprocessing step, but rather directly by the compiler during compilation. Modules also reduce boilerplate by allowing code to be implemented in a single file, rather than being separated across a header file and source implementation. Separation of "interface file" (formally called a "module interface unit") and "implementation file" (formally called a "module implementation unit") is still possible with modules, though modules provide a cleaner encapsulation of code. Separating code interface and source implementation, however, is necessary for benefiting from incremental builds; separated files remain useful in the Pimpl idiom. Just as with headers, a module interface unit may have multiple module implementation units (i.e. the implementation is spread out across multiple files). Modules eliminate the necessity of #include guards or #pragma once, as modules do not directly modify the source code. Modules, unlike headers, do not have to be processed or recompiled multiple times. However, similar to headers, any change in a module necessitates the recompilation of not only the module itself but also all its dependencies, and the dependencies of those dependencies, et cetera. Like headers, modules do not permit circular dependencies, and will not compile. A module implementation unit implicitly imports the primary module interface unit, and all of the modules the primary module interface itself imports (hence, if a module is imported in the interface file, it does not need to be re-imported in the implementation file). If, for example, a module M has module partitions M:A and M:B that are export imported in M's interface unit, then in all of M's implementation units the interfaces are implicitly imported.

Currently, built module interface (BMI) files differ between compilers and are not portable, and highly dependent on exact compiler version, target architecture, and compilation flags (thus are considered more like temporary build artefacts rather than shippable binaries). For example, of the BMIs of the major C++ compilers:

- GCC uses .gcm (GCC compiled module)
- Clang uses .pcm (precompiled module)
- MSVC uses .ifc (interface file container)

A module is imported using the keyword import followed by a module name, (Note: The import keyword in C++ differs in meaning than other languages. For instance, import in Java is actually analogous to using in C++ and not C++ import. In the former, an import simply aliases the type or de-qualifies a namespace, because Java loads .class files dynamically as necessary, thus making all types available simply by fully qualifying all namespaces (rather than having to explicitly declare accessible modules). However, in C++ modules are not automatically all loaded, and thus they must be manually "imported" to be made accessible, as import indicates that the translation unit must access code in the imported module. Thus, it is probably more appropriate to compare import in C++ to import in languages like Swift and Haskell, where importing a module is strictly necessary to use symbols inside it.) while a module is declared with export module followed by the name. An import statement indicates to the compiler to load the built module interface (BMI) file of the module to resolve used symbols. All symbols within a module meant to be publicly exposed are marked export, and importing the module exposes all exported symbols to the translation unit. If a module is never imported, it will never be loaded. Modules can export named symbols, but not macros which are consumed before compilation. Thus, modules prevent unwanted leakage of macros across translation units.

Unlike header inclusions, the order of import statements do not matter. A module can allow for transitive imports by marking an import with export import, which re-exports the imported module to a translation unit that imports the first module. Modules do not enforce any notion of namespaces, though by convention, modules should match namespaces and source file paths (for example, a namespaced class like wikipedia::project::util::ConfigLoader declared in module wikipedia.project.util.ConfigLoader residing in file wikipedia/project/util/ConfigLoader.cppm, similar to Java convention). using statements will only be applied in translation units if explicitly marked export, making it much less likely that using a using statement to bring symbols into the global namespace will cause name clashes across module translation units. This resolves pollution of using statements in headers, which due to textual inclusion of the header by an #include directive, will always result in using statements adding symbols into scope, even if unintentional.

The keyword export was first introduced in C++03 when "exported templates" were added to C++. These were later removed in C++11, due to very few compilers actually supporting the feature. The only compiler known to support exported templates was Comeau C/C++.

=== Standard library modules ===
C++20 specifies the introduction of C++ Standard Library header units, and C++23 adds full module support for the standard library (however modules are informally available in most C++20 implementations). At present, through modules, the standard library must be imported in its entirety (using import std;). The C++ standards offer two standard library modules:

Name	Description
std	Exports all declarations in namespace std and global storage allocation and deallocation functions that are provided by the importable C++ library headers including C library facilities (although declared in standard namespace).
std.compat	Exports the same declarations as the named module std, and additionally exports functions in global namespace in C library facilities. It thus contains "compat" in the name, meaning compatibility with C.

The module names std and std.* are reserved by the C++ standard, and thus declaring a module whose name matches either pattern will issue a compiler warning. However, most compilers provide a flag to bypass or suppress that warning (for example -Wno-reserved-module-identifier in Clang and GCC).

=== Tooling support ===
Currently, only GCC, Clang, and MSVC offer support for modules and import std;. The Clangd language server supports modules.

Build system support varies. CMake, MSBuild, XMake, Meson, and Build2 provide full support for modules. Generated build systems such as Make and Ninja also have support for modules. However, Gradle for C++ and Bazel do not yet support modules. Qt moc does not recognise modules in its preprocessor currently.

=== Example ===
A simple example of using modules is as follows:

MyClass.cppm

export module wikipedia.project.Person;

import std;

using std::string;

export namespace wikipedia::project {

class Person {
private:
    string name;
    int age;
public:
    Person(string name, int age):
        name{std::move(name)}, age{age} {}

    string getName() const {
        return name;
    }

    void setName(string name) {
        this->name = std::move(name);
    }

    int getAge() const noexcept {
        return age;
    }

    void setAge(int age) noexcept {
        this->age = age;
    };
};

}

Main.cpp

import std;

import wikipedia.project.Person;

using wikipedia::project::Person;

int main(int argc, char* argv[]) {
    Person me("John Doe", 10);
    me.setAge(15);
    std::println("Hello, {0}! {0} is {1} years old.", me.getName(), me.getAge());
    // prints "Hello, John Doe! John Doe is 15 years old."
}

Another example, of a separate interface file and implementation file, is as follows:

In interface file Foo.cppm:

export module wikipedia.examples.Foo;

import std;

using std::string;

export namespace wikipedia::examples {

class Foo {
private:
    string name;
    int value;
public:
    Foo(const string& name, int value);

    string getName() const noexcept;
    int getValue() const noexcept;
    void displayValue() const;
};

}

In implementation file Foo.cpp:

module wikipedia.examples.Foo;

// note that the 'std' module is already imported in the module interface

using std::string;

namespace wikipedia::examples {

Foo::Foo(string name, int value):
    name{std::move(name)}, value{value} {}

string Foo::getName() const noexcept {
    return name;
}

int Foo::getValue() const noexcept {
    return value;
}

void Foo::displayValue() const {
    std::println("Value in Foo {}: {}", name, value);
}

}

== Header units ==
Headers may also be imported, even if they are not declared as modules. Imported headers are called "header units", and are designed to allow existing codebases to migrate from headers to modules more gradually. The syntax is similar to including a header, with the difference being that #include is replaced with import. As import statements are not preprocessor directives but rather statements of the language read by the compiler, they must be terminated by a semicolon. Header units automatically export all symbols, and differ from proper modules in that they allow the emittance of macros, meaning all translation units that import the header unit will obtain its contained macros. This offers minimal breakage between migration to modules. The semantics of searching for the file depending on whether quotation marks or angle brackets are used apply here as well. For instance, one may write import <string>; to import the <string> header, or import "MyHeader.h"; to import the file "MyHeader.h" as a header unit. Most build systems, such as CMake, have only experimental support for this.

Similar to Go import statements, header unit imports are followed by a raw string literal representation of the path. However, one cannot write a compile-time string literal and import that expecting it to be interpreted as a path.

== Anatomy ==
=== Module partitions and hierarchy ===
Modules may have partitions, which separate the implementation of the module across several files. Module partitions are declared using the syntax A:B, meaning the module A (called the "primary module") has the partition B. Module partitions cannot individually be imported outside of the module that owns the partition itself, meaning that any translation unit that requires code located in a module partition must import the entire module that owns the partition.

The module partition B is linked back to the owning module A with the statement import :B; in the file containing the declaration of module A or any other module partition of A (say A:C), which implicitly resolves :B to A:B, because the module is named A. These import statements may themselves be exported by the owning module, even if the partition itself cannot be imported directly, and thus importing code from a partition is done by just importing the entire module.

If a module is split between module interface and module implementation, its translation unit consists of both the interface and implementation. Similarly, if a module has partitions, its translation unit encompasses all of those modules as well.

Other than partitions, modules do not have a hierarchical system or "submodules", but typically use a hierarchical naming convention, similar to Java's packages. (Note: It is more appropriate to compare packages in Java and modules in C++, rather than modules in Java and modules in C++. Modules in C++ and Java differ in meaning. In Java, a module (which is handled by the Java Platform Module System) is used to group several packages together, while in C++ a module is a translation unit, strictly speaking.) Only alphanumeric characters, the underscore, and the period may appear in the name of a module. In C++, the name of a module is not tied to the name of its file or the module's location, unlike in Java, and the package it belongs to must match the path it is located in. For example, the modules A and A.B in theory are disjoint modules and need not necessarily have any relation, however employing such a naming scheme with periods in the module name is used to suggest that the module A.B is related or otherwise associated with the module A.

The naming scheme of a C++ module is intended to allow a hierarchy to be suggested, and the C++ standard recommends re-exporting "sub-modules" belonging to the same public API (i.e. module alpha.beta.gamma should be re-exported by alpha.beta, etc.), even though dots in module names do not enforce any hierarchy. The C++ standard recommends lower-case ASCII module names (without hyphens or underscores), even though there is technically no restriction in such names. Also, because modules cannot be re-aliased or renamed (short of re-exporting all symbols in another module), module names can be prefixed with organisation and project names for both clarity and to prevent naming clashes (i.e. google.abseil instead of abseil). Also, unlike Java, whose packages may typically include an additional top-level domain (TLD) in front to avoid namespace clashes, C++ modules need not have this convention (for example, both org.wikipedia.project.foo.Bar and wikipedia.project.foo.Bar are equally valid conventions).

If symbols inside a namespace are exported, the namespace itself is implicitly exported, but only the symbols explicitly exported within it.

export module wikipedia.foo;

namespace wikipedia::foo {
    // not exported, has module linkage
    int secretFunction();

    // exported with namespace
    export int publicFunction1();
    export long publicFunction2();
}

If a module exports a function whose return type or has as a parameter type a non-exported type, the module is ill-formed unless it is a pointer.

export module wikipedia.foo;

namespace wikipedia::foo {
    // non-exported type
    class Hidden {
        // ...
    };

    export Hidden* someFunction(Hidden* h);
}

Client code cannot call methods, access data, or destroy the object. Furthermore, run-time type information (RTTI) cannot inspect the type, but reflection may, as it takes place at compile-time.

=== Module linkage ===
Module linkage allows symbols to be shared across different translation units but only if they belong to the same named module. Such symbols may be accessed by any file part of the module itself, but not from code that imports that module, unless it is explicitly declared export.

=== Module purview and global module fragment ===
In the above example, everything above the line export module wikipedia.project.Person; in the file Person.cppm is referred to as what is "outside the module purview", meaning what is outside of the scope of the module. Typically, all #includes are placed outside the module purview between the statement module; and the declaration of export module, like so:

module; // Optional; marks the beginning of the global module fragment (mandatory if an include directive is invoked above the export module declaration)

// Headers are included in outside the module purview, before the module is declared
#include <windows.h>
#include "MyHeader.h"

export module wikipedia.project.Foo; // Mandatory; marks the beginning of the module preamble

// Imports of named modules and header units come after the module declaration
// Import statements are placed immediately after the module declaration and do not appear after any code or symbol declarations
// In non-module translation units, #include directives precede import statements
import std;
import <cassert>;
import wikipedia.project.util.UtilitySymbols;
import "Foo.h";
import <thirdlib/features/Feature.h>;

// Code here...

module: private; // Optional; marks the beginning of the private module fragment

All code which does not belong to any module exists in the so-called "unnamed module" (also known as the global module fragment), and thus cannot be imported by any module.

The entry point main() may be attached to the global module as of C++26 by marking it extern "C++". This is used for allowing for unit testing non-exported entities in a module.

Many header-only libraries may be easily ported to modules through export extern "C++" over a header, which automatically attaches symbols to the global module, allowing attaching symbols otherwise declared with internal linkage:

export module wikipedia.examples.mylib;

export extern "C++" {
    // Forces the contents in the header to have global module attachment when exported
    #include <wikipedia/examples/MyLib.hpp>
}

=== Private module fragment ===
A module may declare a "private module fragment" by writing module: private;, in which all declarations or definitions after the line are visible only from within the file and cannot be accessed by translation units that import that module. Any module unit that contains a private module fragment must be the only module unit of its module.

== Third-party library support ==
As modules are a recent addition and compiler vendors were notably slow to develop module support, most third-party libraries are still offered only as headers. However, some popular libraries have implemented module support. These include {fmt} (a formatting and printing library, as fmt), nlohmann-json (a JSON library, as nlohmann.json), POCO C++ Libraries (a general purpose C++ library, as Poco), and various libraries from Boost C++ Libraries (a general purpose C++ library, as boost.*). In May of 2026, Microsoft released module support for C++/WinRT, with one module per namespace (as winrt.*).

== Clang C modules ==
An unrelated, but similar feature are Clang C modules. Clang offers non-standard module support for C, however the semantics differ significantly from C++ modules. Clang C modules exist for essentially the same reason as C++ modules:

- To ensure translation units are compiled only once
- To ensure translation units are included only once
- To prevent leakage of unwanted macros
- To ensure clear boundaries of a library (i.e. specify what headers belong to what library)
- To explicitly control what symbols are exported

C modules do not introduce namespacing to symbols. C modules instead use a file called module.modulemap to define modules, similar to Xcode with Objective-C and Swift interoperability. For instance, the C standard library module map may look something like:

module std [system] [extern_c] {
    module assert {
        textual header "assert.h"
        header "bits/assert-decls.h"
        export *
    }

    module complex {
        header "complex.h"
        export *
    }

    module ctype {
        header "ctype.h"
        export *
    }

    module errno {
        header "errno.h"
        header "sys/errno.h"
        export *
    }

    module fenv {
        header "fenv.h"
        export *
    }

    // ...more headers follow...
}

This allows for the importing of C libraries like so:

import std.io;

int main(int argc, char* argv[]) {
    if (argc > 1) {
        printf("Hello, %s!\n", argv[1]);
    } else {
        printf("Hello, world!\n");
    }
    return 0;
}

Clang C modules can also be used in C++, although this is less portable as not only are they a non-standard feature, but also conflict with the existing module system in C++. For example, the std module shown earlier can be extended to C++ using a requires declaration:

module std {
     // C standard library...

     module vector {
         requires cplusplus
         header "vector"
     }

     module type_traits {
         requires cplusplus11
         header "type_traits"
     }

     // more headers...
}

== See also ==
- Precompiled header
- Prefix header
- Single compilation unit
- Java package
- Java Platform Module System
