= Forward declaration =

Declaration of an identifier in computer programming

In computer programming, a forward declaration is a declaration of an identifier (denoting an entity such as a type, a variable, a constant, or a function) for which the programmer has not yet given a complete definition.

It is required for a compiler to know certain properties of an identifier (size for memory allocation, data type for type checking, such as type signature of functions), but it isn't required to know some other details, like the particular value it holds (in case of variables or constants) or definition (in the case of functions). This is particularly useful for one-pass compilers and separate compilation.

Forward declaration is used in languages that require declaration before use; it is necessary for mutual recursion in such languages, as it is impossible to define such functions (or data structures) without a forward reference in one definition: one of the functions (respectively, data structures) must be declared first. It is also useful to allow flexible code organization, for example if one wishes to place the main body at the top, and called functions below it.

In other languages forward declarations are not necessary, which generally requires instead a multi-pass compiler and for some compilation to be deferred to link time. In these cases identifiers must be defined (variables initialized, functions defined) before they can be employed during runtime without the need for pre-definition in the source code for either compilation or interpretation: identifiers do not need to be immediately resolved to an existing entity.

== Examples ==
A basic example in C is void printThisInteger(int);. In C and C++, this represents a forward declaration of a function and is the function's prototype. After processing this declaration, the compiler would allow the program code to refer to the entity printThisInteger() in the rest of the program. The definition for a function must be provided somewhere (same file or other, where it would be the responsibility of the linker to correctly match references to a particular function in one or several object files with the definition, which must be unique, in another):

void printThisInteger(int x) {
    printf("%d\n", x);
}

Variables may have only forward declaration and lack definition. During compilation time these are initialized by language specific rules (to undefined values, 0, null pointers, etc.). Variables that are defined in other source/object files must have a forward declaration specified with a keyword extern:

int foo; // foo might be defined somewhere in this file
extern int bar; // bar must be defined in some other file

In Pascal and other Wirth programming languages, it is a general rule that all entities must be declared before use, and thus forward declaration is necessary for mutual recursion, for instance. In C, the same general rule applies, but with an exception for undeclared functions and incomplete types. Thus, in C it is possible (although unwise) to implement a pair of mutually recursive functions thus:

int first(int x) {
    if (x == 0) {
        return 1;
    } else {
        return second(x - 1); // forward reference to second
    }
}

int second(int x) {
    if (x == 0) {
        return 0;
    } else {
        return first(x - 1); // backward reference to first
    }
}

In Pascal, the same implementation requires a forward declaration of second() to precede its use in first(). Without the forward declaration, the compiler will produce an error message indicating that the identifier second() has been used without being declared.

== Classes ==
In some object-oriented languages like C++ and Objective-C, it is sometimes necessary to forward-declare classes. This is done in situations when it is necessary to know that the name of the class is a type, but where it is unnecessary to know the structure.

In C++, classes and structs can be forward-declared like this:

class Foo;
struct Bar;

In C++, classes can be forward-declared if needing to use the pointer-to-that-class type (since all object pointers are the same size, and the size is the metric that the compiler is concerned with). This is especially useful inside class definitions, e.g. if a class contains a member that is a pointer (or a reference) to another class.

Forward-declaration is used to avoid unnecessary coupling which help reducing compilation time by reducing the number of header inclusion. This has a triple advantage:

- reduce the number of files opened by #include (hence the number of operating system calls)
- reducing the volume of the pre-processed files (as the header is not included)
- reducing recompilation impact when the forward declared class is modified.

Forward declaration of a class is not sufficient if needing to use the actual class type, for example, a member whose type is that class directly (not a pointer), or if using it as a base class, or using the methods of the class in a method.

In Objective-C, classes and protocols can be forward-declared like this:

@class Foo;
@protocol Bar;

In Objective-C, classes and protocols can be forward-declared if needing to use them as part of an object pointer type, e.g. Foo* or id<Bar>. This is especially useful inside class definitions, e.g. if a class contains a member that is a pointer to another class; to avoid circular references (i.e. that class might also contain a member that is a pointer to this class), we simply forward-declare the classes instead.

Forward declaration of a class or protocol is not sufficient if needing to subclass that class or implement that protocol.

== Forward reference ==
The term forward reference is sometimes used as a synonym of forward declaration. However, more often it is taken to refer to the actual use of an entity before any declaration; that is, the first reference to second() in the code above is a forward reference. Thus, we may say that because forward declarations are mandatory in Pascal, forward references are prohibited.

An example of (valid) forward reference in C++:

class Foo {
private:
   int value;
public:
   explicit Foo(int x):
       value{x} {}

   void set(int x) noexcept {
       value = x;
   }

   int get() const noexcept {
       return value;
   }
};

In this example, there are two references to value before it is declared. C++ generally prohibits forward references, but they are allowed in the special case of class members. Since the member function get() cannot be compiled until the compiler knows the type of the member variable value, it is the compiler's responsibility to remember the definition of get() until it sees value's declaration.

Permitting forward references can greatly increase the complexity and memory requirements of a compiler, and generally prevents the compiler from being implemented in one pass.
