= Meson (software) =

Build automation tool

- Logo since 2019

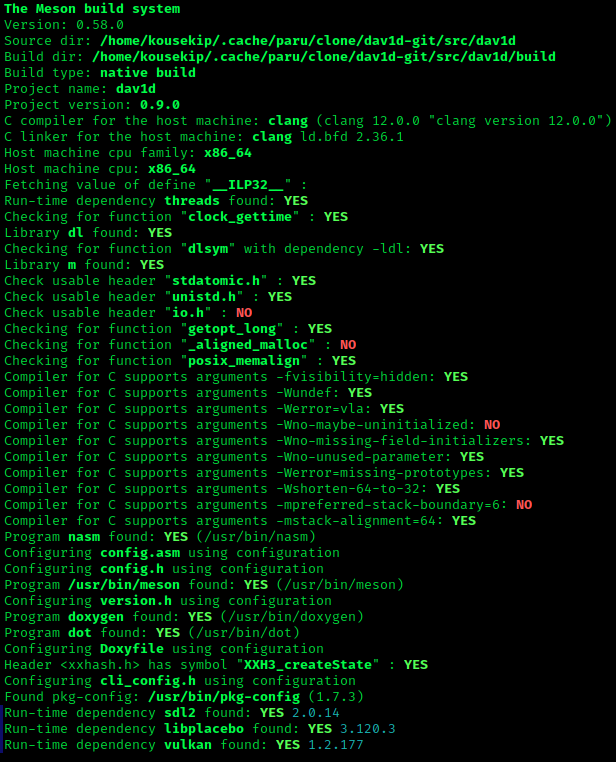
- Meson configuring dav1d
- Developer: Jussi Pakkanen
- Release: 2 March 2013; 13 years ago
- Stable release: 1.12.1 / 22 September 2026; 11 days ago
- Written in: Python
- Operating system: Cross-platform
- Type: Software development tools
- License: Apache License 2.0
- Website: mesonbuild.com
- Repository: github.com/mesonbuild/meson

Meson (/ˈmɛ.sɒn/) is a software build automation tool for building a codebase. Meson adopts a convention over configuration approach to minimize the data required to configure the most common operations. Meson is free and open-source software under the Apache License 2.0.

Meson is written in Python and runs on Unix-like (including Linux and macOS), Windows and other operating systems. It supports building C, C++, C#, CUDA, Objective-C, D, Fortran, Java, Rust, and Vala. It handles dependencies via a mechanism named Wrap. It supports GNU Compiler Collection (gcc), Clang, Visual C++ and other compilers, including non-traditional compilers such as Emscripten and Cython. The project uses ninja as the primary backend buildsystem, but can also use Visual Studio or Xcode backends.

Meson's support for Fortran and Cython was improved to help various scientific projects in their switch from setuptools to Meson, for example SciPy. Meson can be used as a PEP517 backend to build Python wheels, via the meson-python package.

== Language ==
The syntax of Meson's build description files, the Meson language, borrows from Python, but is not Python. It is designed such that it can be reimplemented in any other language; for example, muon is a C implementation, and Meson++ is a C++ implementation. The dependency on Python is an implementation detail.

The Meson language is intentionally not Turing-complete, and therefore can not express an arbitrary program. Instead, arbitrary build steps beyond compiling supported languages can be represented as custom targets.

The Meson language is strongly typed, such that builtin types like library, executable, string, and lists thereof, are non-interchangeable. In particular, unlike Make, the list type does not split strings on whitespace. Thus, whitespace and other characters in filenames and program arguments are handled cleanly.

== Speed and correctness ==
As with any typical buildsystem, correct incremental builds are the most significant speed feature (because all incremental progress is discarded whenever the user is forced to do a clean build).

Unlike bare Make, the separate configure step ensures that changes to arguments, environment variables and command output are not partially applied in subsequent builds, which would lead to a stale build.

Like Ninja, Meson does not support globbing of source files. By requiring all source files to be listed in the build definition files, the build definition file timestamps are sufficient to determine whether the set of source files has changed, thereby ensuring that removed source files are detected. CMake supports globbing, but recommends against it for the same reason.

Meson uses ccache automatically if installed. It also detects changes to symbol tables of shared libraries to skip relinking executables against the library when there are no ABI changes. Precompiled headers are supported, but require configuration. Debug builds are without optimization by default.

== Features ==
A stated goal of Meson is to facilitate modern development practices. As such, Meson knows how to do unity builds, build with test coverage etc. without the programmer having to write support for this.

=== Subprojects ===
Meson can automatically find and use external dependencies installed on the user's system via pkg-config, CMake, and project-specific lookups. Alternatively, or as a fallback, a dependency can be provided as a subproject – a Meson project within another, either contained or as a download link, possibly with patches. This lets Meson resolve dependency hell for the convenience of casual users who want to compile the project, but may contribute to software bloat if a common installed dependency could have been used instead. The mode favored by Linux packagers is therefore fallback.

Meson supports Meson and CMake subprojects. A Meson build file may also refer to the WrapDB service.

=== Cross compilation ===
Cross compilation requires extra configuration, which Meson supports in the form of a separate cross file, which can be external to the Meson project.

=== Installation directory setup ===
Setting the library installation directory on x86_64 Unix is handled automatically by Meson, but not by other tools such as Autotools.

== Adopters ==
GNOME has made it a goal to port its projects to Meson. As of late 2017, GNOME Shell itself exclusively requires Meson after abandoning Autotools, and central components like GTK+, Clutter-GTK, GLib and GStreamer can be built with Meson.

Many freedesktop.org projects have switched to Meson. Systemd relies on Meson since dropping Autotools in version 234, and also X.Org and Mesa were ported to Meson.

== Feature comparison ==
Feature comparison with CMake and Make.

Feature	Meson	CMake	Make
Datatypes	Yes	No	No
List datatype	Yes	semicolon-delimited string	whitespace-delimited string
Dictionary datatype	since 0.47.0	No	No
File globbing	No	Yes	non-standard extension on some variants
Extensible via custom functions	No	Yes	No
Can read output of arbitrary commands (at configure time)	run_command	Yes	Yes
Can run arbitrary commands at build time as recipes of custom targets	Yes	Yes	Yes
Prohibits stale builds (partial rebuild against input change)	Yes (unless there are bugs)	If not globbing source files	Recursive Make (an idiomatic pattern) is broken in this respect
The target that runs tests depends on the tests being built (e.g. test depends on all)	Yes	No, and add_dependencies(test all) is forbidden, because the test target is reserved.	Trivial to add
Ccache	Automatic	Trivial to add	Trivial to add
Distcc	Trivial to add	Trivial to add	Trivial to add
Symbol-table-aware relinking	Yes	Do it yourself	Do it yourself
Precompiled headers	Optional	CMake ≥ 3.16	Do it yourself
Finding installed dependencies	pkg-config, CMake packages	CMake module, pkg-config	—
Downloading dependencies automatically	subproject	FetchContent	—
Finding installed dependencies, with download fallback	pkg-config + subproject	CMake module/pkg-config + FetchContent	—
pkg-config file generator	Yes	No	—
Facilitate use as an auto-downloadable dependency	Can be used as a Meson subproject	No	—

== See also ==
- List of build automation software § Build script generation
