= Var B =

Var B may refer to:

- B-type variable star
- Variable declaration of "b" in computer programming
- M33 Var B, see List of most luminous stars
