= LTCG =

LTCG may refer to:

- Larry the Cable Guy (born 1963), American stand-up comedian, actor, producer, singer and former radio personality
- Link time code generation, a type of computer code optimization
- Long-term capital gains, a type of capital gains tax
- Trabzon Airport in Trabzon, Turkey (ICAO code)
