= Class implementation file =

File implementing the methods of a class

In object-oriented programming, a class implementation file is often used to contain the implementation code for the method(s) of a class. Programming languages like C++ and Objective-C make use of these implementation files so as to separate the interface and implementation of these methods.

== Motivation ==
Using this structure, a class definition file containing the declaration of the class and its members is also created. If the class definition has been included and the implementation file for its methods is available, the user can instantiate an object of the class. The purpose of this structure is to keep the implementation code hidden, but allow the user to view the design.

Users make use of the public interface of an object so as to make creating objects as simple as possible, ensuring that client code does not distract the user with unnecessary details of the class's implementation. This allows the user the information needed to use the class effectively, but prevents him or her from damaging the compiled code.

== The structure of a class implementation file ==
An implementation file is used in C++ programming when creating a class definition to split the interface from the implementation. The header file would declare all the member functions (methods) and data methods (fields) that the class has.

The implementation file will contain the actual definition or source code of the methods declared in the header file. This file can start with a header block, which provides comments that describe the purpose of the defined class and any details about the creation of the actual file, such as the author of the file and date the file was created. It can also include any libraries from the C++ Standard Library that will be used by any of the declared methods in the file. The class implementation file will usually have a line to include the associated header file (see examples below).

=== Example in C++ ===
An example would be having a class called ExampleClass. The header file of this C++ file would be named "Example.hpp" and the implementation file would be "ExampleClass.cpp".

In this example, the implementation for the functions has been omitted, but the functions must be declared in ExampleClass.hpp like this:

#include <string>

namespace wikipedia::examples {

class ExampleClass {
private:
    std::string name;   
public:
    ExampleClass(); // Constructor.
    void addSomething(int k);                   
};

}

An example of the structure of ExampleClass.cpp would look like this:

#pragma once

#include "ExampleClass.hpp"

namespace wikipedia::examples {

ExampleClass::ExampleClass() = default;

void ExampleClass::addSomething(int k) {
    // ...
}

}

This structure can be replicated with C++ modules as well, albeit with slightly different semantics.

In ExampleClass.cppm (the declarations file):

export module wikipedia.examples.ExampleClass;

import std;

using std::string;

export namespace wikipedia::examples {

class ExampleClass {
private:
    string name;   
public:
    ExampleClass(); // Constructor.
    void addSomething(int k);                   
};

}

In ExampleClass.cpp (the definitions/implementations file):

module wikipedia.examples.ExampleClass;

namespace wikipedia::examples {

ExampleClass::ExampleClass() = default;

void ExampleClass::addSomething(int k) {
    // ...
}

}

This can be included into a Main.cpp file like so:

import wikipedia.examples.ExampleClass;

using wikipedia::examples::ExampleClass;

int main() {
    ExampleClass myInst;
    myInst.addSomething(5);
    return 0;
}

=== Example in Objective-C ===
Another example of how a class implementation file would be structured can be seen with Objective-C, which is used in iOS programming. This example will use "ExampleClass". A notable difference between C++ and Objective-C when making use of these implementation files is the extensions used at the end of the files. In C++ it will be .cpp and in Objective-C it will be .m, but both will use the same .h extension for their header file(s) as shown in the example below.

This is an example of ExampleClass.h in Objective-C:

#import <UIKit/UIKit.h>

@interface ExampleClass : NSObject {
    // instance variable declarations go here
}
- (NSString*) name;
@end

This is an example of the class's implementation file Exampleclass.m in Objective-C:

#import "ExampleClass.h"

@implementation ExampleClass
- (NSString*) name {
    return @"…";
}
@end

== See also ==
- C++ classes
- Header file
- Source code
- C++ Standard Library
- Objective-C
