= Mutual recursion =

Two functions defined from each other

In mathematics and computer science, mutual recursion is a form of recursion where two or more mathematical or computational objects, such as functions or datatypes, are defined in terms of each other. Mutual recursion is very common in functional programming and in some problem domains, such as recursive descent parsers, where the datatypes are naturally mutually recursive.

== Examples ==
=== Datatypes ===
The most important basic example of a datatype that can be defined by mutual recursion is a tree, which can be defined mutually recursively in terms of a forest (a list of trees). Symbolically:

$$\begin{cases}
f: [t_1, t_2, ..., t_k] \\
t: v \, f
\end{cases}$$

A forest $f$ consists of a list of trees, while a tree $t$ consists of a pair of a value $v$ and a forest $f$ (its children). This definition is elegant and easy to work with abstractly (such as when proving theorems about properties of trees), as it expresses a tree in simple terms: a list of one type, and a pair of two types. Further, it matches many algorithms on trees, which consist of doing one thing with the value, and another thing with the children.

This mutually recursive definition can be converted to a singly recursive definition by inlining the definition of a forest:

$$t: v \, [t_1, t_2, ..., t_k]$$

A tree $t$ consists of a pair of a value $v$ and a list of trees (its children). This definition is more compact, but somewhat messier: a tree consists of a pair of one type and a list of another, which require disentangling to prove results about.

In Standard ML, the tree and forest datatypes can be mutually recursively defined as follows, allowing empty trees:

datatype 'a tree = Empty | Node of 'a * 'a forest
and      'a forest = Nil | Cons of 'a tree * 'a forest

=== Computer functions ===
Just as algorithms on recursive datatypes can naturally be given by recursive functions, algorithms on mutually recursive data structures can be naturally given by mutually recursive functions. Common examples include algorithms on trees, and recursive descent parsers. As with direct recursion, tail call optimization is necessary if the recursion depth is large or unbounded, such as using mutual recursion for multitasking. Note that tail call optimization in general (when the function called is not the same as the original function, as in tail-recursive calls) may be more difficult to implement than the special case of tail-recursive call optimization, and thus efficient implementation of mutual tail recursion may be absent from languages that only optimize tail-recursive calls. In languages such as Pascal that require declaration before use, mutually recursive functions require forward declaration, as a forward reference cannot be avoided when defining them.

As with directly recursive functions, a wrapper function may be useful, with the mutually recursive functions defined as nested functions within its scope if this is supported. This is particularly useful for sharing state across a set of functions without having to pass parameters between them.

==== Basic examples ====
A standard example of mutual recursion, which is admittedly artificial, determines whether a non-negative number is even or odd by defining two separate functions that call each other, decrementing by 1 each time. The following is such an example of mutual recursion.

// forward declaration
bool isEven(unsigned int);
bool isOdd(unsigned int);

bool isEven(unsigned int n) {
    if (n == 0) {
        return true;
    } else {
        return isOdd(n - 1);
    }
}

bool isOdd(unsigned int n) {
    if (n == 0) {
        return false;
    } else {
        return isEven(n - 1);
    }
}

Note that in C and C++, a forward declaration is necessary, as declarations must exist before the symbol is used. These functions are based on the observation that the question is 4 even? is equivalent to is 3 odd?, which is in turn equivalent to is 2 even?, and so on down to 0. This example is mutual single recursion, and could easily be replaced by iteration. In this example, the mutually recursive calls are tail calls, and tail call optimization would be necessary to execute in constant stack space. In C, this would take $O(n)$ stack space, unless rewritten to use jumps instead of calls. This could be reduced to a single recursive function isEven(). In that case, isOdd(), which could be inlined, would call isEven(), but isEven() would only call itself.

As a more general class of examples, an algorithm on a tree can be decomposed into its behavior on a value and its behavior on children, and can be split up into two mutually recursive functions, one specifying the behavior on a tree, calling the forest function for the forest of children, and one specifying the behavior on a forest, calling the tree function for the tree in the forest. In Python:

def f_tree(tree: Tree) -> None:
    f_value(tree.value)
    f_forest(tree.children)

def f_forest(forest: Forest) -> None:
    for tree in forest:
        f_tree(tree)

In this case the tree function calls the forest function by single recursion, but the forest function calls the tree function by multiple recursion.

Using the Standard ML datatype above, the size of a tree (number of nodes) can be computed via the following mutually recursive functions:

fun size_tree Empty = 0
  | size_tree (Node (_, f)) = 1 + size_forest f
and size_forest Nil = 0
  | size_forest (Cons (t, f')) = size_tree t + size_forest f'

A more detailed example in Scheme, counting the leaves of a tree:

(define (count-leaves tree)
  (if (leaf? tree)
      1
      (count-leaves-in-forest (children tree))))

(define (count-leaves-in-forest forest)
  (if (null? forest)
      0
      (+ (count-leaves (car forest))
         (count-leaves-in-forest (cdr forest)))))

These examples reduce easily to a single recursive function by inlining the forest function in the tree function, which is commonly done in practice: directly recursive functions that operate on trees sequentially process the value of the node and recurse on the children within one function, rather than dividing these into two separate functions.

==== Advanced examples ====
A more complicated example is given by recursive descent parsers, which can be naturally implemented by having one function for each production rule of a grammar, which then mutually recurse; this will in general be multiple recursion, as production rules generally combine multiple parts. This can also be done without mutual recursion, for example by still having separate functions for each production rule, but having them called by a single controller function, or by putting all the grammar in a single function.

Mutual recursion can also implement a finite-state machine, with one function for each state, and single recursion in changing state; this requires tail call optimization if the number of state changes is large or unbounded. This can be used as a simple form of cooperative multitasking. A similar approach to multitasking is to instead use coroutines which call each other, where rather than terminating by calling another routine, one coroutine yields to another but does not terminate, and then resumes execution when it is yielded back to. This allows individual coroutines to hold state, without it needing to be passed by parameters or stored in shared variables.

There are also some algorithms which naturally have two phases, such as minimax (min and max), which can be implemented by having each phase in a separate function with mutual recursion, though they can also be combined into a single function with direct recursion.

=== Mathematical functions ===
In mathematics, the Hofstadter Female and Male sequences are an example of a pair of integer sequences defined in a mutually recursive manner.

Fractals can be computed (up to a given resolution) by recursive functions. This can sometimes be done more elegantly via mutually recursive functions; the Sierpiński curve is a good example.

== Prevalence ==
Mutual recursion is very common in functional programming, and is often used for programs written in LISP, Scheme, ML, and similar programming languages. For example, Abelson and Sussman describe how a meta-circular evaluator can be used to implement LISP with an eval-apply cycle. In languages such as Prolog, mutual recursion is almost unavoidable.

Some programming styles discourage mutual recursion, claiming that it can be confusing to distinguish the conditions which will return an answer from the conditions that would allow the code to run forever without producing an answer. Peter Norvig points to a design pattern which discourages the use entirely, stating:

If you have two mutually-recursive functions that both alter the state of an object, try to move almost all the functionality into just one of the functions. Otherwise you will probably end up duplicating code.

== Terminology ==
Mutual recursion is also known as indirect recursion, by contrast with direct recursion, where a single function calls itself directly. This is simply a difference of emphasis, not a different notion: "indirect recursion" emphasises an individual function, while "mutual recursion" emphasises the set of functions, and does not single out an individual function. For example, if $f$ calls itself, that is direct recursion. If instead $f$ calls $g$ and then $g$ calls $f$, which in turn calls $g$ again, from the point of view of $f$ alone, $f$ is indirectly recursing, while from the point of view of $g$ alone, $g$ is indirectly recursing, while from the point of view of both, $f$ and $g$ are mutually recursing on each other. Similarly a set of three or more functions that call each other can be called a set of mutually recursive functions.

== Conversion to direct recursion ==
Mathematically, a set of mutually recursive functions are primitive recursive, which can be proven by course-of-values recursion, building a single function $F$ that lists the values of the individual recursive function in order: $F = f_1(0), f_2(0), f_1(1), f_2(1), \dots,$ and rewriting the mutual recursion as a primitive recursion.

Simple mutual recursion between two procedures can be converted to direct recursion by inlining the code of one procedure into the other. If there is only one site where one procedure calls the other, this is straightforward; if there are several it can involve code duplication. In terms of the call stack, two mutually recursive procedures yield a stack $ABABAB...$, and inlining $B$ into $A$ yields the direct recursion $(AB)(AB)(AB)...$.

More generally, any number of procedures can be merged into a single procedure that takes as argument a variant record (or algebraic data type) representing the selection of a procedure and its arguments; the merged procedure then dispatches on its argument to execute the corresponding code and uses direct recursion to call self as appropriate. This can be seen as a limited application of defunctionalization. This translation may be useful when any of the mutually recursive procedures can be called by outside code, so there is no obvious case for inlining one procedure into the other. Such code then needs to be modified so that procedure calls are performed by bundling arguments into a variant record as described; alternately, wrapper procedures may be used for this task.

== See also ==
- Cycle detection (graph theory)
- Recursion (computer science)
- Circular dependency
