= Declaration (computer programming) =

Programming language construct specifying an identifier's properties

In computer programming, a declaration in a syntactic language construct is the process of specifying identifier properties for its initialization: it declares a word's (identifier's) meaning. Declarations are most commonly used for functions, variables, constants, and classes, but can also be used for other entities such as enumerations and type definitions. Beyond the name (the identifier itself) and the kind of entity (function, variable, etc.), declarations typically specify the data type (for variables and constants), or the type signature (for functions); types may also include dimensions, such as for arrays. A declaration is used to announce the existence of the entity to the compiler; this is important in those strongly typed languages that require functions, variables, and constants, and their types to be specified with a declaration before use, and is used in forward declaration. The term "declaration" is frequently contrasted with the term "definition", but meaning and usage varies significantly between languages; see below.

Declarations are particularly prominent in languages in the ALGOL tradition, including the BCPL family, most prominently C and C++, and also Pascal. Java uses the term "declaration", though Java does not require separate declarations and definitions.

== Declaration vs. definition ==
One basic dichotomy is whether or not a declaration contains a definition: for example, whether a variable or constant declaration specifies its value, or only its type; and similarly whether a declaration of a function specifies the body (implementation) of the function, or only its type signature. Not all languages make this distinction: in many languages, declarations always include a definition, and may be referred to as either "declarations" or "definitions", depending on the language. (Note: For example, Java uses "declaration" (class declaration, method declaration), while Python uses "definition" (class definition, function definition).) However, these concepts are distinguished in languages that require declaration before use (for which forward declarations are used), and in languages where interface and implementation are separated: the interface contains declarations, the implementation contains definitions. (Note: This distinction is observed in Pascal "units" (modules), and in conventional C and C++ code organization, which has header files consisting largely of pure declarations, and source files consisting of definitions, though this is not always strictly observed, nor enforced by the language.)

In informal usage, a "declaration" refers only to a pure declaration (types only, no value or body), while a "definition" refers to a declaration that includes a value or body. However, in formal usage (in language specifications), "declaration" includes both of these senses, with finer distinctions by language: in C and C++, a declaration of a function that does not include a body is called a function prototype, while a declaration of a function that does include a body is called a "function definition". In Java declarations occur in two forms. For public methods they can be presented in interfaces as method signatures, which consist of the method names, input types and output type. A similar notation can be used in the definition of abstract methods, which do not contain a definition. The enclosing class can be instantiated, rather a new derived class, which provides the definition of the method, would need to be created in order to create an instance of the class. Starting with Java 8, the lambda expression was included in the language, which could be viewed as a function declaration.

== Declarations and definitions ==
In the C-family of programming languages, declarations are often collected into header files, which are included in other source files that reference and use these declarations, but don't have access to the definition. The information in the header file provides the interface between code that uses the declaration and that which defines it, a form of information hiding. A declaration is often used in order to access functions or variables defined in different source files, or in a library. A mismatch between the definition type and the declaration type generates a compiler error.

For variables, definitions assign values to an area of memory that was reserved during the declaration phase. For functions, definitions supply the function body. While a variable or function may be declared many times, it is typically defined once (in C++, this is known as the One Definition Rule or ODR).

Dynamic languages such as JavaScript or Python generally allow functions to be redefined, that is, re-bound; a function is a variable much like any other, with a name and a value (the definition).

Here are some examples of declarations that are not definitions, in C:

extern char example1;
extern int example2;
void example3(void);

Here are some examples of declarations that are definitions, again in C:

char example1; /* Outside of a function definition it will be initialized to zero.  */
int example2 = 5;
void example3(void) { /* definition between braces */ }

== Undefined variables ==
In some programming languages, an implicit declaration is provided the first time such a variable is encountered at compile time. In other languages, such a usage is considered to be an error, which may result in a diagnostic message. Some languages have started out with the implicit declaration behavior, but as they matured they provided an option to disable it (e.g. Perl's "use strict" or Visual Basic's "Option Explicit").

== See also ==
- Expression (computer science)
- Initialization (programming)
- Scope (computer science)
- Semantics (programming languages)
