= Pragma once =

C/C++ directive to block repeated header inclusions

In the C and C++ programming languages, #pragma once is a non-standard but widely supported preprocessor directive designed to cause the current header file to be included only once in a single compilation. Thus, #pragma once serves the same purpose as #include guards, but with several advantages, including less code, avoidance of name clashes, and sometimes improvement in compilation speed. While #pragma once is available in most modern compilers, it remains outside of the standard, and its implementation is tricky and may not always be reliable.

Modules, introduced in C++20, use an import keyword, eliminating the necessity of #pragma once due to not being handled by the preprocessor. Modules can only be imported at most one time into a translation unit.

== Example ==
File Grandparent.h

#pragma once

struct Foo {
    int member;
};

File Parent.h

#include "Grandparent.h"

File Child.c

#include "Grandparent.h"
#include "Parent.h"

In this example, the inclusion of Grandparent.h in both Parent.h and Child.c would ordinarily cause a compilation error, because a struct with a given name can only be defined a single time in a given compilation. The #pragma once directive serves to avoid this by ignoring subsequent inclusions of Grandparent.h.

== Advantages ==
Using #pragma once allows the C preprocessor to include a header file when it is needed and to ignore an #include directive otherwise. This has the effect of altering the behavior of the C preprocessor itself, and allows programmers to express file dependencies in a simple fashion, obviating the need for manual management.

The most common alternative to #pragma once is to use #define to set an #include guard macro, the name of which is picked by the programmer to be unique to that file. For example,

#ifndef GRANDPARENT_H
#define GRANDPARENT_H

// ... contents of Grandparent.h

#endif // GRANDPARENT_H

This approach minimally ensures that the contents of the included file are not seen more than once. This is more verbose, requires greater manual intervention, and is prone to programmer error as there are no mechanisms available to the compiler for prevention of accidental use of the same macro name in more than one file, which would result in only one of the files being included. Such errors are unlikely to remain undetected but can complicate the interpretation of a compiler error report. Since the pre-processor itself is responsible for handling #pragma once, the programmer cannot make errors which cause name clashes.

In the absence of #include guards around #include directives, the use of #pragma once will improve compilation speed for some compilers since it is a higher-level mechanism; The compiler itself can compare filenames or inodes without having to invoke the C preprocessor to scan the header for #ifndef and #endif. Yet, since #include guards appear very often and the overhead of opening files is significant, it is common for compilers to optimize the handling of #include guards, making them as fast as #pragma once.

== Caveats ==
Identifying the same file on a file system is not a trivial task. Symbolic links and especially hard links may cause the same file to be found under different names in different directories. Compilers may use a heuristic that compares file size, modification time and content. Additionally, #pragma once can do the wrong thing if the same file is intentionally copied into several parts of a project, e.g. when preparing the build. Whereas #include guards would still protect from double definitions, #pragma once may or may not treat them as the same file in a compiler-dependent way. These difficulties, together with difficulties related to defining what constitutes the same file in the presence of hard links, networked file systems, etc. has so far prevented the standardization of #pragma once.

The use of #include guard macros allows dependent code to recognize and respond to slight differences in semantics or interfaces of competing alternatives. For example,

#include TLS_API_MACRO // defined on the command line

// ...

#if defined TLS_A_H
// ... use one known API
#elif defined TLS_B_H
// ... use another known API
#else
#error "unrecognized TLS API"
#endif

In this case, the direct determination for which API is available would make use of the fact that the include file had advertised itself with its #include guard macro.

The #include directive is defined to represent a programmer's intention to actually include the text of a file at the point of the directive. This may occur several times within a single compilation unit, and is useful for evaluating macro-containing contents multiple times against changing definitions of the macro.

The use of #pragma once, like the use of #include guard macros within an included file places the responsibility upon its authors in order to protect against undesired multiple inclusion. Over-reliance upon either mechanism on the part of programmers by direct, unprotected use of #include directives without their own #include guard will lead to failure when using an include file that has not protected itself with either mechanism.

== Portability ==
Compiler	Support
Clang	Yes
Comeau C/C++	Yes
Cray C and C++	Yes (since 9.0)
C++Builder	Yes (since XE3. classic compiler only.)
Digital Mars C++	Yes
GNU Compiler Collection (GCC)	Yes (officially since 3.4)
HP C/aC++	Yes (since at least A.06.12)
IBM XL C/C++	Yes (since 13.1.1)
Intel C++ Compiler	Yes
Microsoft Visual C++	Yes (since 4.2)
NVIDIA CUDA Compiler	Yes (depending on the underlying host compiler)
Pelles C	Yes
ARM DS-5	Yes
IAR C/C++	Yes
Arm Keil Microcontroller Tools: C/C++ compilers	Yes (e.g. KEIL ARMCC 5)
OpenWatcom	Yes
Oracle Developer Studio C/C++	Yes (since 12.5)
Portland Group C/C++	Yes (since at least 17.4)
TinyCC	Yes (since April 2015)
SDCC	Yes(still Undocumented Oct 2024)
TASKING VX-toolset for TriCore: C Compiler	Yes (since v6.2r2)
Texas Instruments Code Generation Tools: C Compiler	Yes (e.g. MSP430, ARM, C2000)
Renesas CC-RL/CC-RX/CC-RH	No (CC-RL, CC-RX, CC-RH)

There was a proposal in 2016 that attempted to standardise #pragma once with a new directive, #once, with additional features, such as specifying library name, file name, and version (for example, for a library named MyLibrary in a file named Foo.h with version 0.1.0, the directive used would be #once MyLibrary::Foo 0.1.0); the version parameter was optional. It also proposed a #forget directive, which would remove the identifier from the compiler's seen identifiers (for example #forget MyLibrary::Foo). However, this feature was never adopted.
