= Ninja (build system) =

Free build automation software

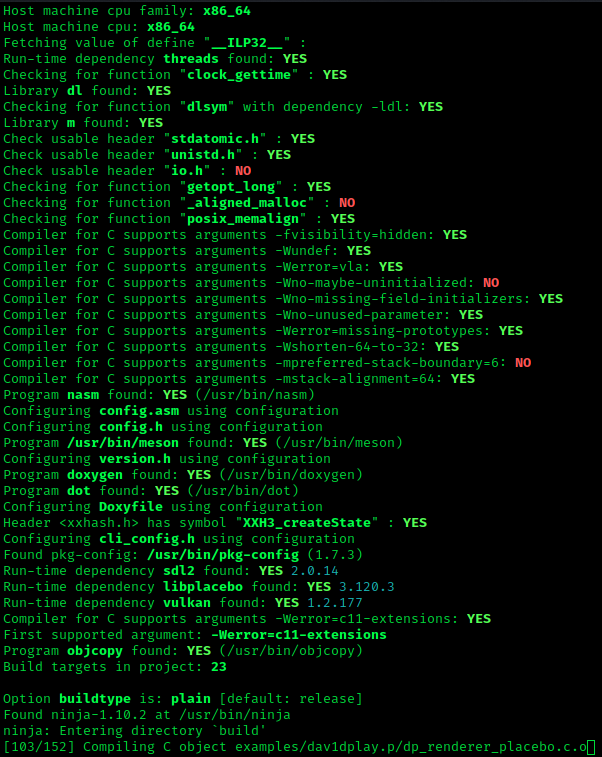
- Ninja being used to compile dav1d, in conjunction with Meson configuration
- Developer: Evan Martin
- Initial release: 2012; 13 years ago
- Stable release: 1.13.2 / 20 November 2025; 24 days ago
- Repository: github.com/ninja-build/ninja
- Written in: C++, Python
- Operating system: Linux, macOS, Windows
- Type: Software development tools
- License: Apache License 2.0
- Website: ninja-build.org

Ninja is a build system developed by Evan Martin, a Google employee. Ninja has a focus on speed and it differs from other build systems in two major respects: it is designed to have its input files generated by a higher-level build system, and it is designed to run builds as fast as possible.

== Build system ==
In essence, Ninja is meant to replace Make, which is slow when performing incremental (or no-op) builds. This can considerably slow down developers working on large projects, such as Google Chrome, which compiles 40,000 input files into a single executable. In fact, Google Chrome is a main user and motivation for Ninja. It's also used to build Android (via Makefile translation by Kati), and is used by most developers working on LLVM.

In contrast to Make, Ninja lacks features such as string manipulation, as Ninja build files are not meant to be written by hand. Instead, a "build generator" should be used to generate Ninja build files. Gyp, CMake, Meson, and gn are popular build management tools that support creating build files for Ninja.

== Example ==
Below is an example of a Ninja build file that compiles two C source files (source1.c and source2.c) into object files and then links them into an executable called myprogram. It defines two rules: one for compiling (cc) and one for linking (link):

rule cc
  command = gcc -c -o $out $in
  description = CC $out
 
rule link
  command = gcc -o $out $in
  description = LINK $out
 
build source1.o: cc source1.c
build source2.o: cc source2.c
build myprogram: link source1.o source2.o
