= Include guard =

Macro guard in C/C++ to block multiple inclusions

In the C and C++ programming languages, an #include guard, sometimes called a macro guard, header guard or file guard, is a way to avoid the problem of double inclusion (in which the preprocessor includes the content of the same header file multiple times) when dealing with the include directive.

When the preprocessor encounters the #include directive, it copies the entire listed file into a copy of the main file, often referred to as the translation unit. (For example, #include "foo.h" will duplicate the entire contents of foo.h into the file in which the directive appears)

However, this may present a problem if one file is included into the same translation unit multiple times. Because of the One Definition Rule, the compilation will fail, since all definitions from the included file appear more than once.

#include guards prevent this by defining a preprocessor macro when a header is first included. In the event that header file is included a second time, the #include guard will prevent the actual code within that header from being compiled.

An alternative to #include guards is #pragma once. This non-standard but commonly supported directive among C and C++ compilers has the same purpose as an #include guard, but has less code and does not require the definition of a variable.

Modules, introduced in C++20, use the import keyword, and therefore eliminate the necessity of #include guards, due to not being handled by the preprocessor. Modules can only be imported at most one time into a translation unit.

== Double inclusion ==
=== Example ===
The following C code demonstrates a real problem that can arise if #include guards are missing:

Grandparent.h

struct Foo {
    int member;
};

Parent.h

#include "Grandparent.h"

Child.c

#include "Grandparent.h"
#include "Parent.h"

Result

// From "Grandparent.h"
struct Foo {
    int member;
};
// From "Parent.h"
struct Foo {
    int member;
};

Here, the file Child.c has indirectly included two copies of the text in the header file Grandparent.h. This causes a compilation error, since the structure type Foo will thus be defined twice. In C++, this would be called a violation of the one definition rule.

== Use of #include guards ==
=== Example ===
The same code as the previous section is used with the addition of #include guards. The C preprocessor preprocesses the header files, including and further preprocessing them recursively. This will result in a working source file.

Grandparent.h

#ifndef GRANDPARENT_H
#define GRANDPARENT_H

struct Foo {
    int member;
};

#endif // GRANDPARENT_H

Parent.h

#include "Grandparent.h"

Child.h

#include "Grandparent.h"
#include "Parent.h"

Intermediate step

// Contents from "Grandparent.h"
#ifndef GRANDPARENT_H // GRANDPARENT_H was not defined
#define GRANDPARENT_H

// This definition was pasted
struct Foo {
    int member;
};

#endif // GRANDPARENT_H

// Contents from "Parent.h"
#ifndef GRANDPARENT_H // GRANDPARENT_H was already defined
#define GRANDPARENT_H

// This definition was not pasted
struct Foo {
    int member;
};

#endif // GRANDPARENT_H

Result

struct Foo {
    int member;
};

Here, the first inclusion of "Grandparent.h" has the macro GRANDPARENT_H defined. When "Child.c" includes "Grandparent.h" at the second time (while including "Parent.h"), as the #ifndef test returns false, the preprocessor skips down to the #endif, thus avoiding the second definition of struct Foo. The program compiles correctly.

=== Discussion ===
Different naming conventions for the guard macro may be used by different programmers. Other common forms of the above example include GRANDPARENT_INCLUDED, CREATORSNAME_YYYYMMDD_HHMMSS (with the appropriate time information substituted), and names generated from a UUID. (However, names starting with one underscore and a capital letter (C and C++) or any name containing double underscore (C++ only), such as _GRANDPARENT_H and GRANDPARENT__H, are reserved to the language implementation and should not be used by the user.)

Of course, it is important to avoid duplicating the same #include-guard macro name in different header files, as including the 1st will prevent the 2nd from being included, leading to the loss of any declarations, inline definitions, or other #includes in the 2nd header.

There was a proposal in 2016 that attempted to standardise #include guards (or #pragma once) with a new directive, #once, with additional features, such as specifying library name, file name, and version (for example, for a library named MyLibrary in a file named Foo.h with version 0.1.0, the directive used would be #once MyLibrary::Foo 0.1.0); the version parameter was optional. It also proposed a #forget directive, which would remove the identifier from the compiler's seen identifiers (for example #forget MyLibrary::Foo). However, this feature was never adopted.

== Difficulties ==
For #include guards to work properly, each guard must test and conditionally set a different preprocessor macro. Therefore, a project using #include guards must work out a coherent naming scheme for its #include guards, and make sure its scheme doesn't conflict with that of any third-party headers it uses, or with the names of any globally visible macros.

For this reason, most C and C++ implementations provide a non-standard #pragma once directive. This directive, inserted at the top of a header file, will ensure that the file is included only once. The Objective-C language (which is a superset of C) has an #import directive, which works exactly like #include, except that it includes each file only once, thus obviating the need for #include guards.

== Other languages ==
Some languages support specifying that the code should be included only once, in the including file, rather than in the included one (as with C/C++ #include guards and #pragma once):

- PL/I uses the %INCLUDE statement as the equivalent to C's #include directive. IBM Enterprise PL/I also supports the %XINCLUDE statement which will "incorporate external text into the source program if it has not previously been included." (It also offers an XPROCEDURE statement, similar to a PROCEDURE statement, which will ignore the second and subsequent occurrences of an XPROCEDURE with the same name.)
- Objective-C's #import directive (see above)
- PHP's include_once

== See also ==
- Pragma once
- C preprocessor
- Circular dependency
- One Definition Rule
- PL/I preprocessor
