= Minicom (disambiguation) =

Minicom may be:

- The common British name for a telecommunications device for the deaf or textphone
- Minicom, a modem control and terminal emulation program
- Minicom Advanced Systems, a manufacturer of KVM Switches and Audio Video Distribution for Digital Signage
