= Rob Savoye =

American computer programmer

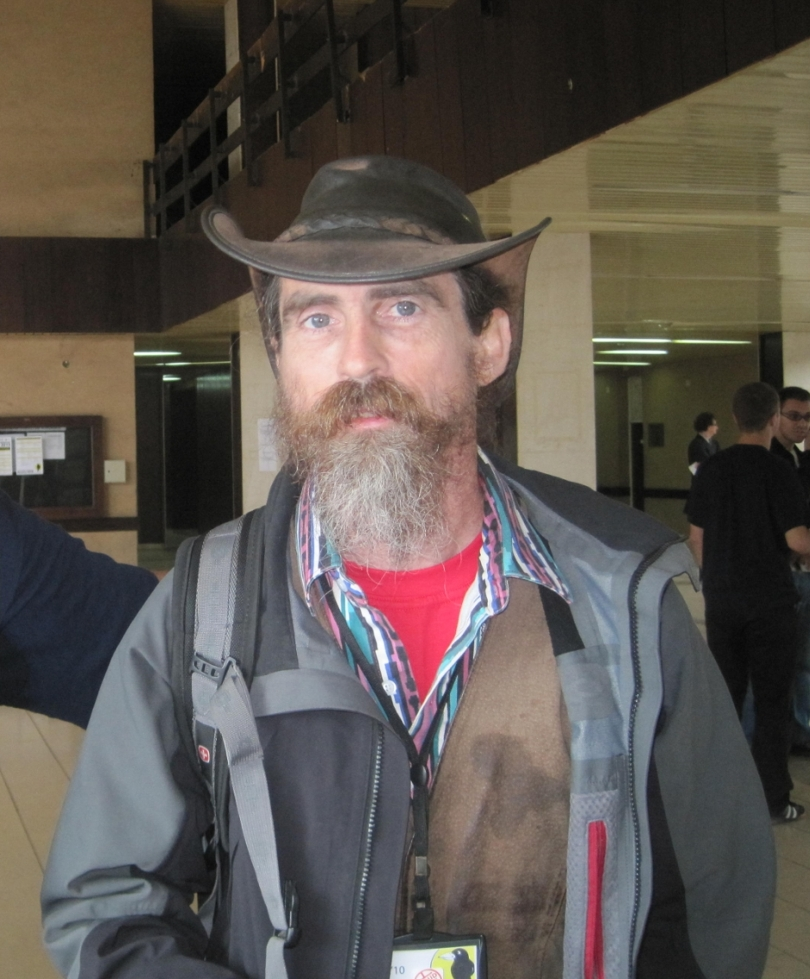
Rob Savoye at SFK '10

Rob Savoye is the primary developer of Gnash. He is a developer for the GNU Project, having worked on Debian, Red Hat and dozens of other free/open source software projects. He was among the first employees of Cygnus Support, which was sold to Red Hat in 2001.

== Activities ==
He began programming computers in 1977 using Fortran 4. Some of the projects he has worked on include the GNU Compiler Collection, GNU Debugger, DejaGnu, Newlib, Libgloss, Cygwin, eCos, the Center-TRACON Automation System, Expect, multiple major Linux distributions, and One Laptop Per Child. He runs his own consultancy company, Seneca Software & Solar.

Rob Savoye manages an unofficial website for the Rainbow Family of Living Light.

He resides outside of Nederland, Colorado and is an avid ice climber and outdoorsman. Additionally, Rob is involved in search and rescue of lost and stranded hikers and climbers, and is a founding member of IMSAR (the Ilchester Mountain Search and Rescue organization).

Rob is also involved in the Humanitarian OpenStreetMap Team, having had the role of Senior Technical Lead since September 2020.

He is currently leading development of the LibrePhone project, intended to reverse engineer binary blobs that are inside the software controllers used in the hardware in cell phones, so that custom ROMs can be free from proprietary software.

== Awards ==
At Libre Planet 2011, Savoye received the individual achievement FSF Award for the advancement of Free Software for decades of work on free software projects, particularly his leading role in the development of Gnash.
