= Taler =

Taler may refer to:

- Thaler, a European silver coin
- Täler, part of Hügelland/Täler, a Verwaltungsgemeinschaft ("collective municipality") in the district Saale-Holzland, in Thuringia, Germany
- Laura Taler, Romanian-born Canadian artist
- Krzysztof Henryk Taler, president of Opoczno S.A., Poland
- GNU Taler, a micropayment system, France
- Taler (cryptocurrency), a Belarusian cryptocurrency
