= Open source in Kosovo =

Open-source software projects in Kosovo

The first open-source software project in Kosovo was the adjustment of the Open Office Packet in December 2003.

On 28 July 2004, GGSL, an Albanian team of Linux users, was one of the first public organizations for getting information about open source, This conference was called "Software Freedom Day". which is known as the first FOSS initiative in Kosovo. The conference was held to promote the free and open software (FOSS) movement. Some of the issues that were discussed were the Linux operating system and the definitions of free software and open sources in general. KDE and GNOME desktop environments (DEs) were also discussed in conference.

Ati-Kos has made surveys in five municipal assemblies of Kosovo in May 2005. According to this survey, about 98.6% wanted software box in mother tongue, Albanian. In another survey, most of the participants believed a software box like Open Office would help increase productivity because of the interface in Albanian.

== Free Libre Open Source Software Kosovo ==
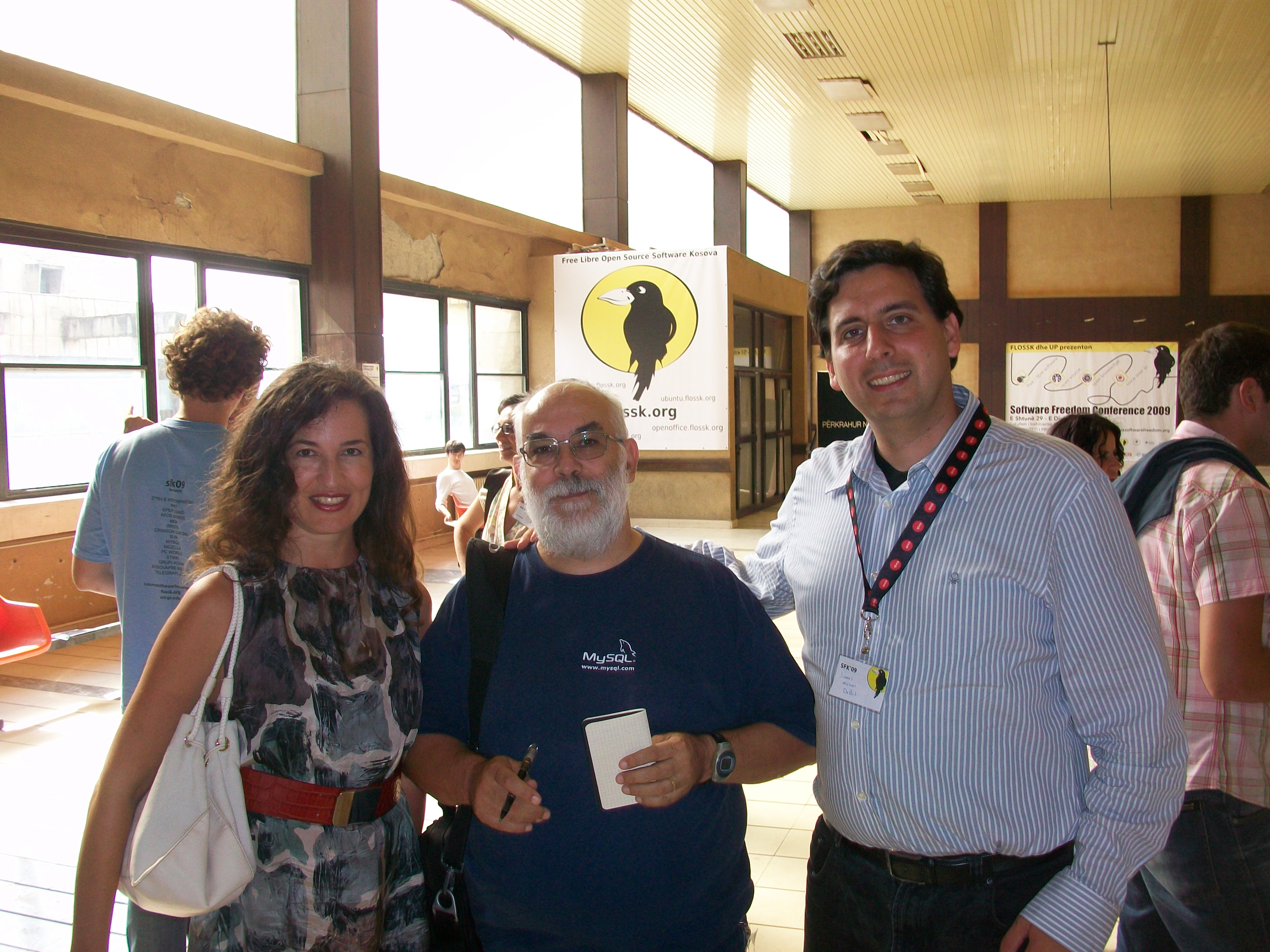
James Michael DuPont (right) and Giuseppe Maxia

FLOSS Kosovo (FLOSSK) is a non-governmental organization that was established in March 2009 to promote FOSS software. This initiative was undertaken by James Michael DuPont in association with volunteers from Kosovo. In August of that year in the Faculty of Electrical and Computer Engineering, the first conference of this organization was held. The conference became an annual event that became the biggest conference in the region; it was called "Software Freedom Kosovo 2009".

== Open source projects and training ==
=== The first course of Linux ===
In February 2009, James Micheal DuPont became the first person in Kosovo to teach the operating system Linux. In June of that year, some of the students continued to teach about the OS.

=== OpenStreetMap ===
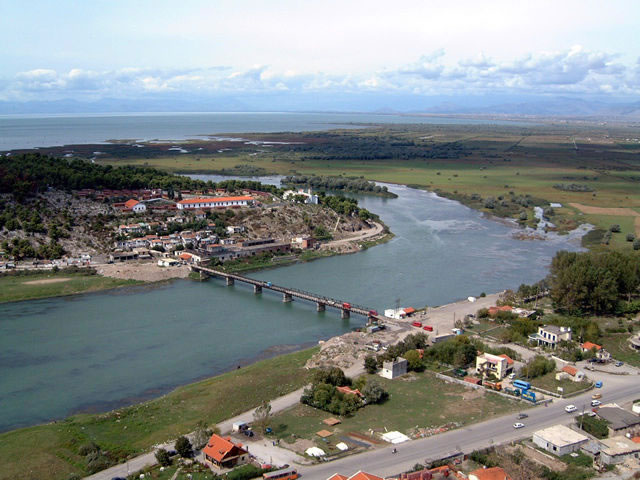
Shkodra, Albania

OpenStreetMap contributes mostly to open-source software in Kosovo. Together with the OpenStreetMap community, companies like LogisticPlus have contributed to the movement. . Its beginnings have been seen in the map which was made for Brod town, which was endangered by environmental damage. This project was introduced by Joachim Bergerhoff, who told to FLOSSK UN-HABITAT had a project for them. FLOSSK helped in the development of this project. The map, which was created by community, included Brod, Gjilan, Gjakova, Ferizaj, Prizren, Peja, and Pristina. Another project was also the project for Shkodra, when in 2010 the community helped the survivors of flooding to find the streets.

=== Kumevotu.info ===
"Kumevotu.info" is a project for youths of Flossk to help people find the places where they can vote in the 2010 election. This project was held until 12 December 2010 and was based on OpenStreetMap, where the user gives his personal data and he can find the place where he should vote. The project was very useful, even for the youngsters who participated in creating it.

=== OLPC ===
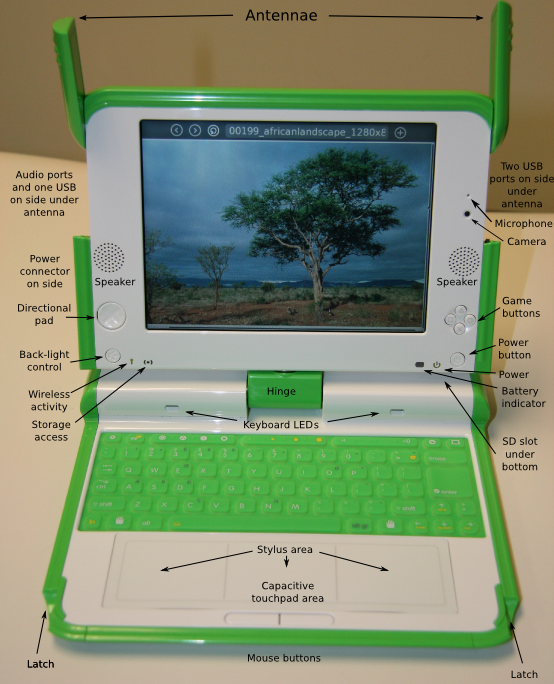
OLPC project

OLPC was one of the most attractive FOSS projects in Kosovo because it was dedicated to children and poor places where children use a laptop to learn about Linux. This laptop was based on a version of Fedora and it had some basic applications. It was also equipped with WiFi, where people could browse the internet and learn. The project was very welcomed in Kosovo.

=== Wikipedia project ===
The Albanian community of open source in Kosovo has been active in Wikipedia and Wikimedia, and has been dealing mainly with promoting open knowledge by translating Wikipedia articles in Albanian. This initiative was made by FLOSSK, and it resulted with 31,458 articles in Albanian. In 2013, a conference called 'WikiacademyKosovo' was held; it was a direct way of adding articles in Wikipedia.

=== Fedora project ===
The Fedora project is also active in Kosovo. It is promoted and distributed by its ambassadors in Kosovo: Ardian Haxha and Gent Thaqi. FLOSSK in association with the ambassadors organize parties to announce new versions.

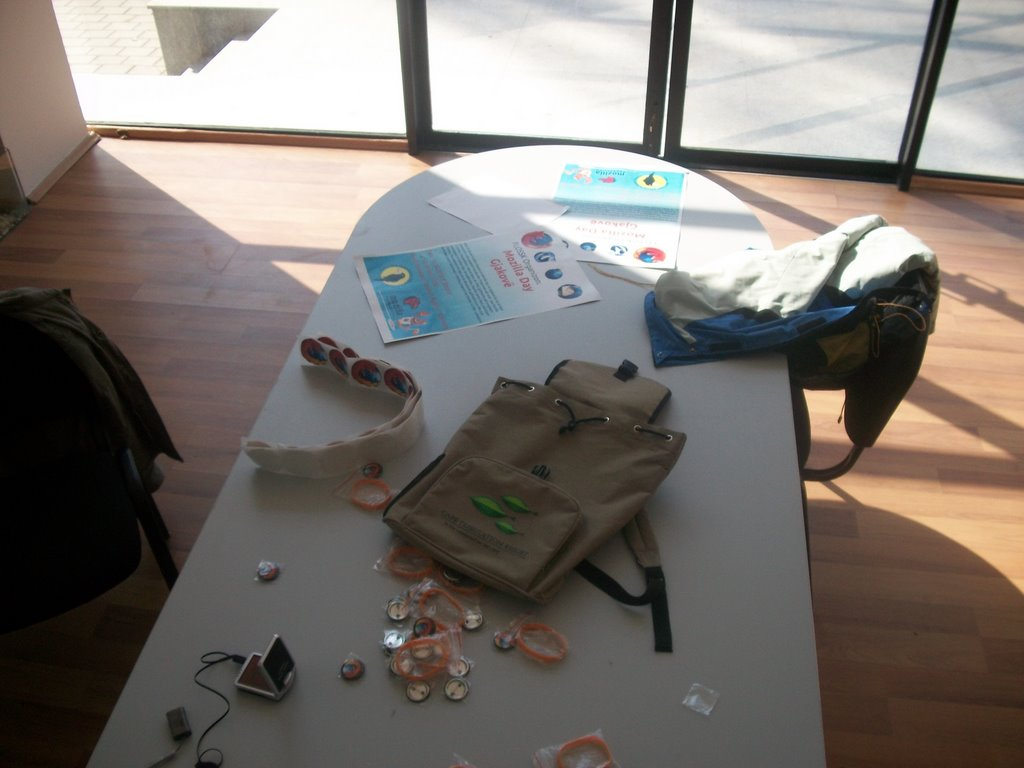
FlOSSK, Mozilla Projects

=== Mozilla project ===
The Mozilla Firefox community is active in Kosovo. FLOSSK was also promoting the Mozilla Project. The ambassadors in Kosovo and Heroid Shehu are very active in promoting the project.

=== Drupal training ===
In Kosovo, there have also been projects about the platform Drupal. FLOSSK in association with UNICEF Lab organized a training project on 6 May with Dave Hall, who is a member of free software, counselor, and administrator of the systems in Australia. The participants were trained in Drupal to use and developing this content management system.

== Conferences ==
=== Software Freedom Kosovo 2009 ===
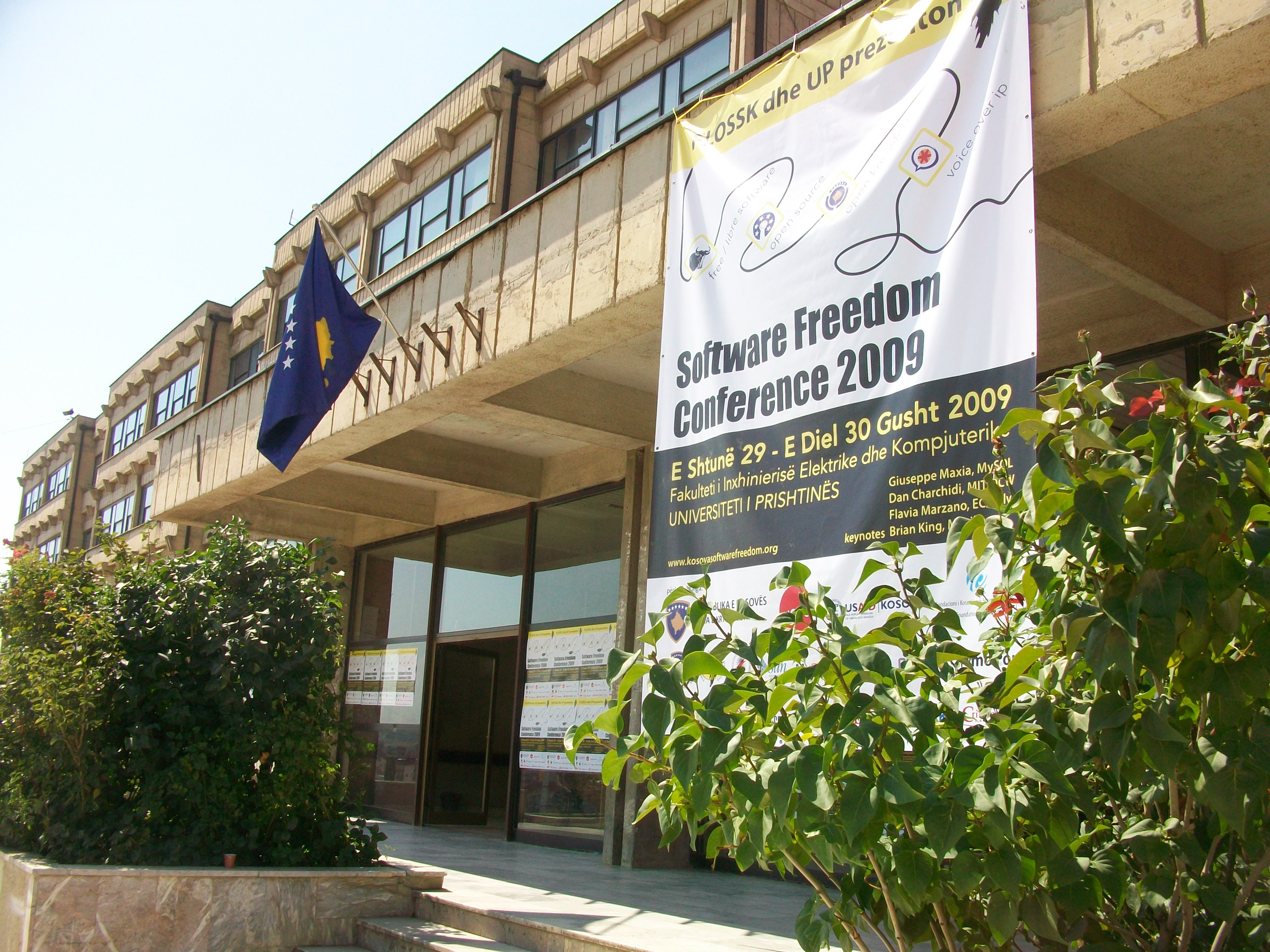
University of Pristina, FIEK

On 29 and 30 August 2009, the first annual conference, "Software Freedom Kosovo 2009", was held in the premises of Faculty of Engineering organized by FLOSSK and University of Pristina. In the conference were presented the public figures from the FOSS world:

- Giussepe Maxia by Sun Microsystems, who is also the MySQL community manager
- Dan Carchidi from the Massachusetts Institute of Technology (MIT) who spoke of Open Courseware (OCW)
- Flavia Marzano, Italy's representative at the European Commission on issues of Free and Open Source Software and,
- Brian King from Mozilla who spoke for Firefox browser and its extensions.

Speech at SFK 2009

Presented from Kosovo were also :

- Prof. Dr. Blerim Rexha – Deputy Minister of Energy and Mining
- Prof. Asc. Myzafere Limani – Dean of Faculty of Electrical Engineering and Computer
- Lule Ahmedi – FIEK professor and

James Michael DuPont – Co-founder of FLOSSK

Above 40 topics were discussed in lectures on various fields including Wikipedia, Free Encyclopedia, Linux, intellectual property licenses, building communities, and programming languages PHP and Python. This conference was called one of the most extensive in Southeast Europe.

=== Software Freedom Kosovo 2010 ===
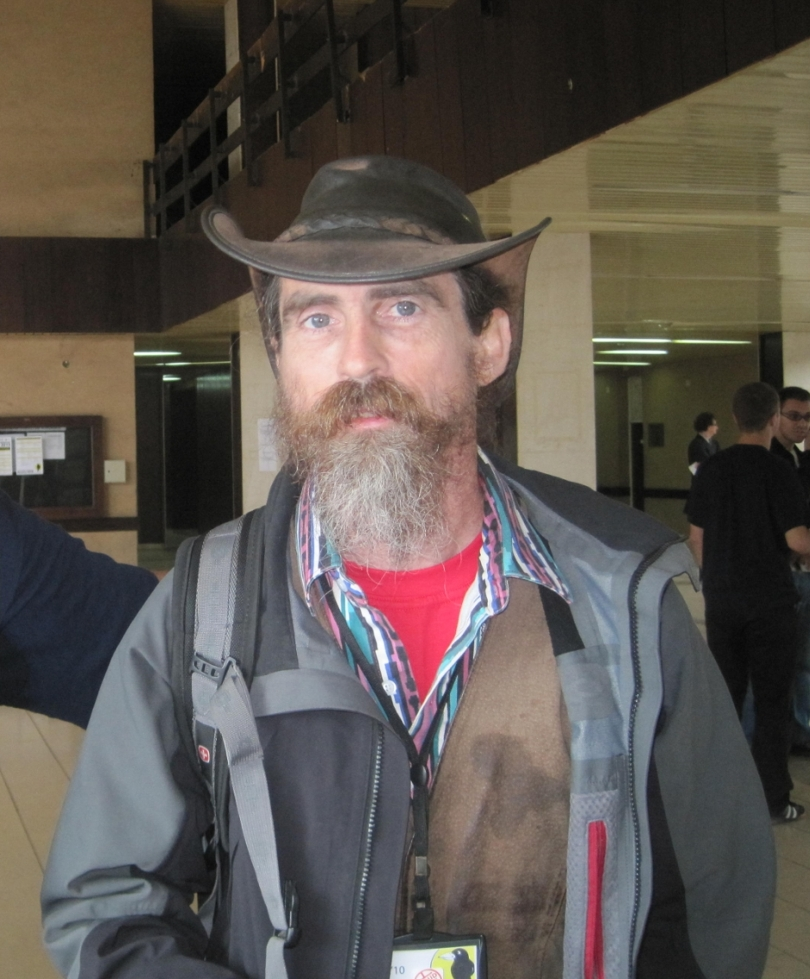
Rob Savoye at Software Freedom Kosovo 2010

"Software Freedom Kosovo 2010" was held on 25–26 September in Pristina. SFK10 again was organized by FLOSS Kosovo and the Faculty of Electrical Engineering and Computer (FIEK) of the University of Pristina.

There were 24 lectures from Kosovo and overseas.

The main lecturers and also guests of honor of this conference were:

- Leon Shiman, board member of X.Org Foundation, and owner of Shiman Associates consulting firm
- Rob Savoye, the primary developer of Gnash as previously developed for Debian, Red Hat and Yahoo. Savoye codes since 1977
- Mikel Maron, OpenStreetMap Foundation board member
- Peter Salus, linguist, computer scientist and historian of technology.

And also other topics were also offered by:

- Milot Shala
- Martin Bekkelund
- Baki Goxhaj
- Marco Fioretti

The conference was held at the premises of Faculty of Electrical and Computer Engineering.

=== Software Freedom Kosovo 2011 ===
The 2011 iteration of the conference was held on 12 November 2011. With over 300 participants, this conference was one of the most successful held till now. The day-long event was themed "Doing Business with Open Source”. The introductory remarks were made by:

- Muzafere Limani (FIEK dean),
- Lule Ahmedi (professor at FIEK and Conference Co-leader),
- Vjollca Cavolli (STIKK Director) and
- Arianit Dobroshi (President of FLOSSK's board)

. Speakers for the first half of the day were; Gëzim Pula, CEO of 3CIS, Amir Neziri, James Michael DuPont, Ervis Tusha and Marian Marionv. In the second part of the day, there were presentations by: Arian Xheaziri of Chyrp CMS, P. Chriesteas of OpenERP, Jonian Dervishi of Ditari.im, Edlira Kalemi, Damjan Georgievski, Flakerim Ismani of Ruby on Rails, and Erdet Nasufi,

The final lecture was by Omer Keser, a Google executive, who spoke on the Google mobile applications and the development of mobile-phone use across different states.

=== Software Freedom Kosovo 2012 ===
This conference focused on web technologies that are standards-based and vendor such as HTML5 and JavaScript. It was held on 8–9 September in the Faculty of Electrical and Computer Engineering, in Pristina.

=== Software Freedom Kosovo 2013 ===
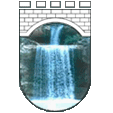
Klina Embleme

The 2013 conference was held in the Faculty of Education in the University of Pristina. Some of the topics that were discussed include mobile open web, hacker spaces, data protection, freelancing and code sharing scaling cloud.

More than 170 participants and many speakers, including Alex Lakatos, a JavaScript developer and Mozilla representative; Redon Skikuli, another Mozilla Representative and co-founder of Design Everview in Tirana, Arianit Dobroshi, a member of FLOSSK; Arbnor Hasani currently involved with Innovations Lab in Kosovo at the Design Center, Ana Risteska, a contributor to the GNOME project; and Burim Shala, WordPress theme developer.

Two days of the conference were held elsewhere and focused on practical things by the participants, like Tuning Postagre SQL with Bert Desmet, Awesome HTML5/CSS3 with Vleran Dushi, WordPress and Template Development with Burim Shala and WMKIT Arduino workshop with Redon Sikuli.

== Open Source in Government ==
In November 2004, Klina municipality started a project to change computer network in Linux and OpenOffice.org. The first part of the project was charged with Firefox and OpenOffice.org, and the second part was charged with Linux. From 3rd to 6 November in that year, 70% of municipality had computer network in English-language, and OpenOffice.org and Firefox in Albanian. The proliferation of open source software products has benefits to many companies and government of Kosovo because the costs are significantly lower and security is higher. UNDP FOSS Club has also trained municipal employees. A survey conducted at the end of training 100% of employees stated they prefer the software to be in Albanian. The project for the translation of OpenOffice.org in Albanian started in that year. UNDP FOSS team consisted of members from Bulgaria and Kosovo.

== Richard Stallman's visit in Kosovo ==
On 4 June 2010, Richard Stallman, a free software activist and programmer, visited Kosovo. He lectured on the topic "A Free Digital Society" at the National Library of Kosovo. The lecture was about the freedom of the digital society and the threats that have to do with it. Stallman mentioned many countries where digital freedom is violated, such as Denmark, Australia, where many web pages have been closed for unclear reasons. He said the presence of free software and freedom in educational institutions is necessary for the countries that want to advance their societies and who do not want to be dependent on software that they have to pay for.

He also said:

Today I had a meeting with the Minister of Education in Kosovo who offered to help in implementation of the free software in schools of Kosovo. This will help your country to develop, to be free, independent and not weak. Working on this project you will be more powerful and you will give the others also the opportunity to get knowledge about freedom of software. —Richard Stallman

At the end, Stallman answered questions put forth by the participants in the room.

== Wiki Academy Kosovo ==
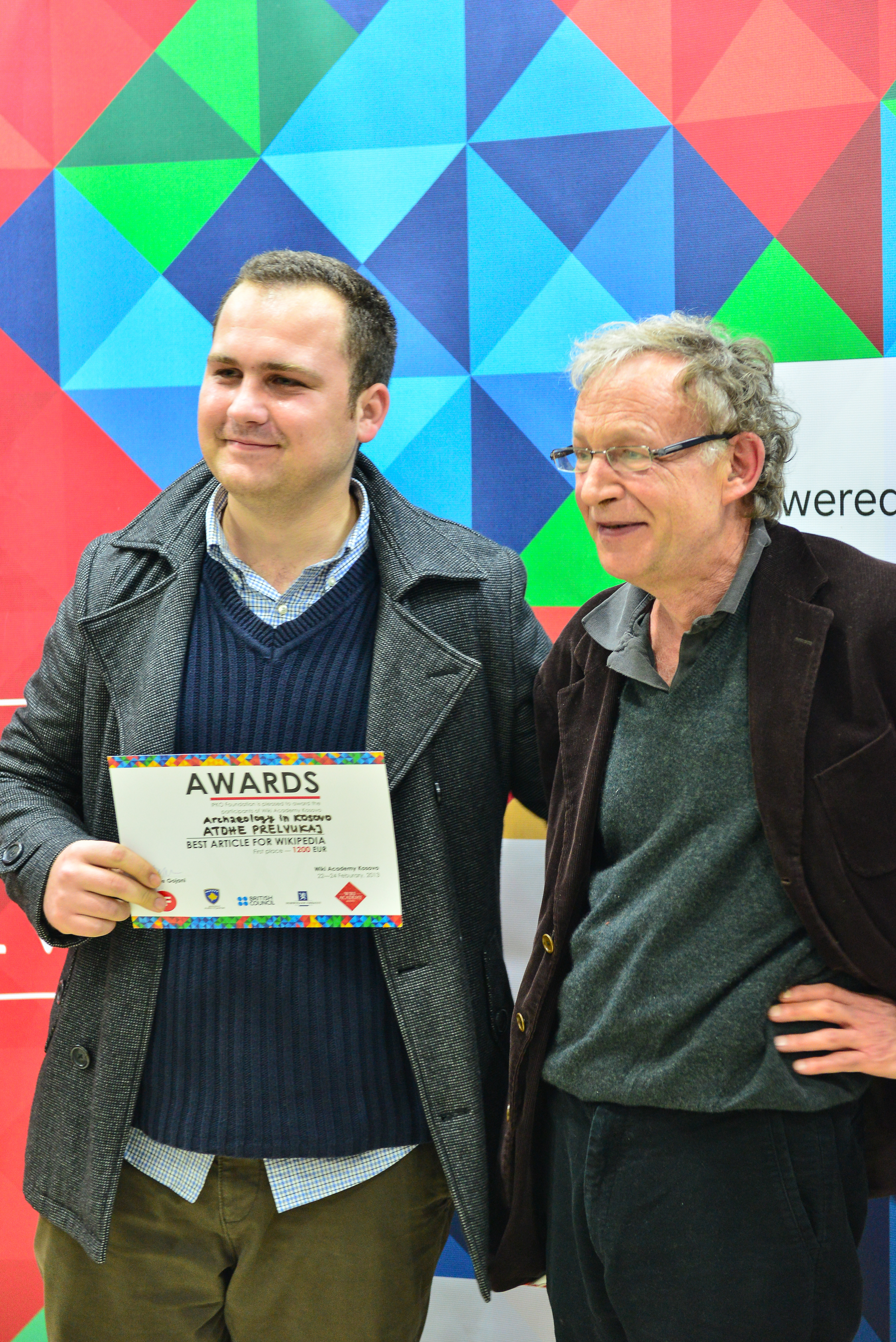
The winner of the contest

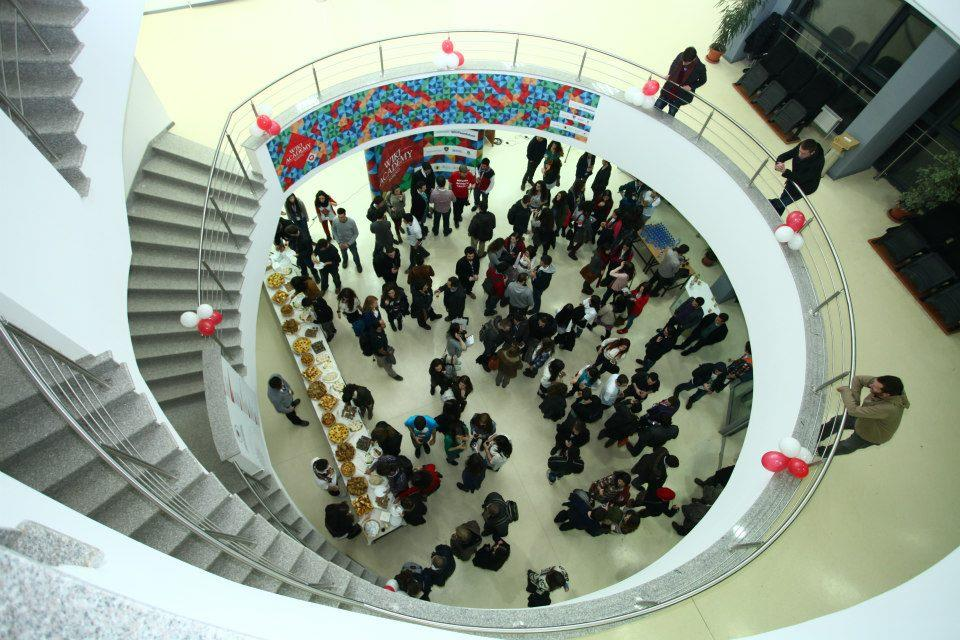
Wiki Academy Kosovo

During 22–24 February 2013, at the Faculty of Education near University of Pristina, the first academy was held, which was called "WikiacademyKosovo". This conference was held to promote Kosovo in the digital world and to emphasize its good things through new and qualitative articles and pictures in Wikimedia. The academy revealed articles about cultural heritage, social issues, geography, institutions, economy, and tourism; it was also a starting point to improve the image of Kosovo. A number of mentors of Wikipedia were present at this event. The winners of the academy were writings such as:

- Archaeology of Kosovo – Atdhe Prelvukaj,
- Classical Music in Kosovo- Liburn Jupolli, Mic Sokoli, Edona Vatoci,
- Information and Communications Technology in Kosovo- Dardan Ahmeti.

This academy was supported by the Ministry of Internal Affairs of the Republic of Kosovo, the Great Britain Embassy, the Royal Embassy of Norway, British Council, IPKO foundation and FLOSSK.
