= Cu (Unix utility) =

Software to connect two computers

cu
- Other names: call Unix
- Initial release: 1983; 42 years ago
- Written in: C
- Operating system: Unix, Unix-like
- Platform: Cross-platform

cu ("call Unix") is a Unix utility for establishing a connection between two computer systems via a serial port to another computer system. When cu was originally created, connections to remote systems were most often done by phone, and cu was used in conjunction with UUCP utilities to transfer data via a modem. Now that intersystem communications are much more easily and reliably handled via Internet connections, its more typical use is to establish a terminal connection to another system via a modem or direct cabling.

It was originally released as part of the 4.2BSD Unix operating system in 1983. In the same year, it was one of several UNIX tools available for Charles River Data Systems' UNOS operating system under Bell Laboratories license. In the following years it was included in many Unix and Unix-like operating systems, including Solaris and Linux.

== Command-line arguments ==
cu [-v] [--speed <bps>] [--line device] (<hostname> | <phone-number>)

== See also ==
- tip (Unix utility)
