= Tip (Unix utility) =

Unix utility for connecting to remote systems

tip is a Unix utility for establishing a terminal connection to a remote system via a modem. It is commonly associated with BSD Unix, as well as other UNIX operating systems such as Sun's Solaris. It was originally included with 4.2BSD. The name may refer to ARPANET's Terminal Interface Processor (TIP), a variant of the IMP, used to connect serial terminals directly with ARPANET.

tip is referred to in the Solaris documentation as the preferred terminal emulator to connect to a Sun workstation's serial port for maintenance purposes, for example, to configure the OpenPROM firmware.

== Basics ==
tip is one of the commands referenced in the expect reference book by Don Libes.

The tip command line options are as follows:

tip [-v] [-speed-entry] (<hostname> | <phone-number> | <device>)

Use ~. to exit.
Use ~# to break (Stop-A on a Sun keyboard).
Use ~? to list all commands.

== Examples ==
This Expect script is a simple example that establishes a terminal session:

spawn tip modem
expect "connected"
send "ATD$argc\r"
set timeout 30
expect "CONNECT"

As tip does not have the built-in logging capabilities that Minicom has, we need to use some other means to record the session. One way is to use script:

$ script -a install.log
Script started, file is install.log
$ tip hardwire
[tip session takes place.]
$ exit
Script done, file is install.log
$

and so on. In the above example, run on a Sun SPARC 20 workstation running Solaris 9, we first created a log file called install.log in the current directory using script' and then tell tip to use serial port B.

== Exploit ==
In early versions of Linux, tip was often installed as a setuid root binary, which means it ran with root privileges even when executed by a normal user. Staog, the first malware on Linux, took advantage of that, along with the buffer overflow in tip to gain root privilege access to the system. The vulnerabilities exploited by Staog have long been patched in all major Linux distributions, making the virus no longer a threat.

== See also ==
- cu (Unix utility), a similar command
