= Minicom =

Terminal emulator

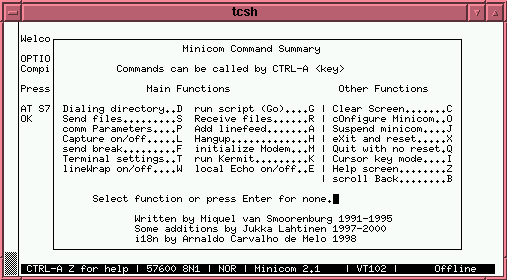
- Minicom run in an X11 xterm window
- Original author: Miquel van Smoorenburg
- Developer: Adam Lackorzynski
- Stable release: 2.11.1 / 28 February 2026; 5 months ago
- Written in: C
- Operating system: Linux, POSIX
- Platform: Cross-platform
- Type: Terminal emulator
- License: GNU General Public License v2.0
- Website: salsa.debian.org/minicom-team/minicom
- Repository: salsa.debian.org/minicom-team/minicom

Minicom running a Windows Server 2003 EMS prompt

Minicom is a text-based modem control and terminal emulator program for Unix-like operating systems including Cygwin, originally written by Miquel van Smoorenburg, and modeled somewhat after the popular MS-DOS program Telix but is open source. Minicom includes a dialing directory, ANSI and VT100 emulation, an (external) scripting language, and other features. Minicom is a menu-driven communications program. It also has an auto ZMODEM download. It now comes packaged in most major Linux distribution repositories such as Debian, Ubuntu and Arch Linux.

A common use for Minicom is when setting up a remote serial console, perhaps as a last resort to access a computer if the LAN is down. This can be done using nothing more than a 386 laptop with a Minicom floppy distribution such as Pitux or Serial Terminal Linux. For this purpose, though, one may use Kermit on DOS, such as FreeDOS, does not need Linux so can use a 286 or possibly an 8086 or 8088.

Minicom is used to display command outputs for devices without a display, such as switches, routers or server blade enclosures. It is also useful for data logging output from serial devices such as Arduino Uno. Minicom has some beneficial features that are not available in all terminal based serial communication programs such as adding operating system timestamp to serial data.

== See also ==
- tip (Unix utility)
- PuTTY
- Tera Term
- List of Terminal Emulators
