= GNU Libtool =

Shared library creation tool from GNU

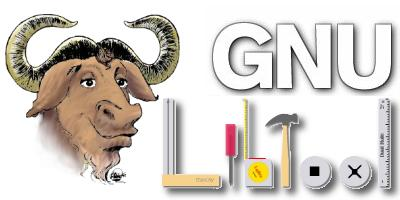
- Developer: GNU Project
- Release: July 9, 1997; 29 years ago
- Stable release: 2.5.3 (September 25, 2024; 2 years ago) [±]
- Operating system: Cross-platform
- Type: Library
- License: GPLv2
- Website: www.gnu.org/software/libtool/
- Repository: git.savannah.gnu.org/cgit/libtool.git

GNU Libtool is a software development tool, part of the GNU build system, consisting of a shell script created to address the software portability problem when compiling shared libraries from source code. It hides the differences between computing platforms for the commands which compile shared libraries. It provides a command-line interface that is identical across platforms and it executes the platform's native commands, allowing software authors to offer build support for their code across many diverse platforms such as Linux, BSD variants, Windows (via Cygwin), HP-UX, Solaris (including on SPARC processors), AIX, and IRIX.

== Rationale ==
Different operating systems handle shared libraries differently. Some platforms do not use shared libraries at all. It can be difficult to make a software program portable: the C compiler differs from system to system; certain library functions are missing on some systems; header files may have different names.

Libtool helps manage the creation of static and dynamic libraries on various Unix-like operating systems. Libtool accomplishes this by abstracting the library-creation process, hiding differences between various systems (e.g. Linux systems vs. Solaris).

GNU Libtool is designed to simplify the process of compiling a computer program on a new system, by "encapsulating both the platform-specific dependencies, and the user interface, in a single script". When porting a program to a new system, Libtool is designed so the porter need not read low-level documentation for the shared libraries to be built, rather just run a configure script (or equivalent).

== Use ==
Libtool is used by Autoconf and Automake, two other portability tools in the GNU build system. It can also be used directly.

== Clones and derivatives ==
Since GNU Libtool was released, other free software projects have created drop-in replacements under different software licenses. slibtool is one such implementation.

== See also ==
- GNU Compiler Collection – Free and open-source compiler for various programming languages
- pkg-config – Software development tool for querying library dependency information
