= GNOWSYS =

- Developer: The GNU Project
- Stable release: 1.0 rc1
- Operating system: Cross-platform
- Type: Semantic computing
- License: AGPL-3.0-or-later
- Website: www.gnu.org/software/gnowsys/
- Repository: git.savannah.gnu.org/cgit/gnowsys.git

GNOWSYS (Gnowledge Networking and Organizing system) is a specification for a generic distributed network based memory/knowledge management. It is developed as an application for developing and maintaining semantic web content. It is written in Python. It is implemented as a Django app. The GNOWSYS project was launched by Nagarjuna G. in 2001, while he was working at Homi Bhabha Centre for Science Education (HBCSE).

The memory of GNOWSYS is designed as a node-oriented space. A node is described by other nodes to which it has links. The nodes are organized and processed according to a complex data structure called the neighborhood.

== Applications ==
The application can be used for web-based knowledge representation and content management projects, for developing structured knowledge bases, as a collaborative authoring tool, suitable for making electronic glossaries, dictionaries and encyclopedias, for managing large web sites or links, developing an online catalogue for a library of any thing including books, to make ontologies, classifying and networking any objects, etc. This tool is also intended to be used for an on-line tutoring system with dependency management between various concepts or software packages. For example, the dependency relations between Debian packages have been represented by the gnowledge portal.

== Component Classes ==
The kernel is designed to provide support to persistently store highly granular nodes of knowledge representation like terms, predicates and very complex propositional systems like arguments, rules, axiomatic systems, loosely held paragraphs, and more complex structured and consistent compositions. All the component classes in GNOWSYS are classified according to complexity into three groups, where the first two groups are used to express all possible well formed formulae permissible in a first order logic.

=== Terms ===
‘Object’, ‘Object Type’ for declarative knowledge, ‘Event’, ‘Event Type’, for temporal objects, and ‘Meta Types’ for expressing upper ontology. The objects in this group are essentially any thing about which the knowledge engineer intends to express and store in the knowledge base, i.e., they are the objects of discourse. The instances of these component classes can be stored with or without expressing ‘instance of’ or ‘sub-class of’ relations among them.

=== Predicates ===
This group consists of ‘Relation’, and ‘Relation Type’ for expressing declarative knowledge, and ‘Function’ and ‘Function Type’ for expressing procedural knowledge. This group is to express qualitative and quantitative relations among the various instances stored in the knowledge base. While instantiating the predicates can be characterized by their logical properties of relations, quantifiers and cardinality as monadic predicates of these predicate objects.

=== Structures ===
‘System’, ‘Encapsulated Class’, ‘Program’, and ‘Process’, are other base classes for complex structures, which can be combined iteratively to produce more complex systems. The component class ‘System’ is to store in the knowledge base a set of propositions composed into ontologies, axiomatic systems, complex systems like say a human body, an artifact like a vehicle etc., with or without consistency check. An ‘Encapsulated Class’ is to compose declarative and behavioural objects in a flexible way to build classes. A ‘Program’ is not only to store the logic of any complete program or a component class, composed from the already available behavioural instances in the knowledge base with built-in connectives (conditions, and loops), but also execute them as web services. A ‘Process’ is to structure temporal objects with sequence, concurrency, synchronous or asynchronous specifications.

Every node in the database keeps the neighbourhood information, such as its super-class, sub-class, instance-of, and other relations, in which the object has a role, in the form of predicates. This feature makes computation of drawing graphs and inferences, on the one hand, and dependency and navigation paths on the other hand very easy. All the data and metadata is indexed in a central catalogue making query and locating resources efficient.
