= GNU fcrypt =

Disk encryption software project

- Developer(s): Fabio Gonzalez
- Operating system: Linux, GNU/Hurd
- Type: Disk encryption software
- License: GNU GPL
- Website: https://www.gnu.org/software/fcrypt

GNU fcrypt was a disk encryption software project intended to offer multiple hidden partitions, "on the fly encryption" (automatic and transparent encryption), and "plausible deniability". The now disbanded project was part of the GNU project. In November 2012 Richard Stallman, dubbed fcrypt as an official GNU project, after that the program was called GNU fcrypt.

The software's encryption was intended to prove resistant to being cracked by quantum computers.
