= 3DLDF =

3D technical drawing software package

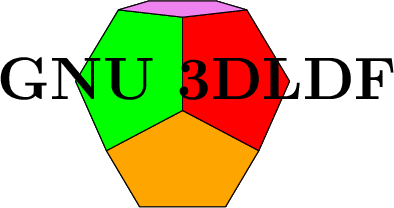
- Developer: GNU Project
- Stable release: 2.0.3 / 13 December 2013; 11 years ago
- Operating system: Linux, Unix
- Type: 3D computer graphics software
- License: GNU GPL
- Website: gnu.org/software/3dldf/

GNU 3DLDF is a GNU software package for three-dimensional technical drawing. Currently, its only form of output is MetaPost code. GNU 3DLDF is written in C++ using the CWEB package created by Donald Knuth and Silvio Levy. It is intended, among other things, to provide a convenient way of creating 3D graphics for inclusion in TeX documents and to fit in with the "family" of programs associated with TeX. It was written by Laurence D. Finston. 3DLDF stands for "3D" plus the initials of the author (LDF). This name was chosen because the author considered it unlikely that it would clash with the name of any other software package for 3D graphics.

== History ==
3DLDF seemed not a pure MetaPost package as it is written in C++ using CWEB, but in 2004, it was seen by some as the greatest promise for MetaPost's 3D drawing capabilities.
