= GNU Taler =

Electronic payment system

- Developers: Christian Grothoff and Florian Dold
- Release: May 10, 2025; 18 months ago
- Stable release: 1.5 / 21 March 2026; 7 months ago
- Type: Microtransaction and electronic payment
- License: Clients: GPL-3.0-or-later; Servers: AGPL-3.0-or-later; Libraries: LGPL-2.1-or-later
- Website: taler.net
- Repository: git.taler.net

GNU Taler is a free software-based microtransaction and electronic payment system. Unlike most other decentralized payment systems, GNU Taler does not use a blockchain. A blind signature is used to protect the privacy of users as it prevents the exchange from knowing which coin it signed for which customer.

The project is led by Florian Dold and Christian Grothoff of Taler Systems SA. Taler is short for the "Taxable Anonymous Libre Economic Reserves" and alludes to the Taler coins in the Holy Roman Empire during the Early Modern period. It has vocal support from GNU Project founder Richard Stallman. Stallman has described the program as "designed to be anonymous for the payer, but payees are always identified." In a paper published in Security, Privacy, and Applied Cryptography Engineering, GNU Taler is described as meeting ethical considerations – the paying customer is anonymous while the merchant is identified and taxable. An implementation is provided by Taler Systems SA.

== Project history ==
In November 2014 taler.net was launched by INRIA as a new electronic payment system, and Christian Grothoff introduced it a month later in a fOSSa conference talk at INRIA.

Taler became an official GNU package in February 2015, and its first release was made on June 1 2016.

In 2016 Taler Systems S.A. was created (headquartered in Luxembourg), to provide business support and management for the Taler users. The same year they have published Web Payments paper and finished Chrome and Firefox plugins available for testing.

In 2020 the project received a grant from NLnet and the European Commission's Horizon 2020 Next Generation Internet (NGI) initiative to perform an external security audit of the system, which was done by CodeBlau in July. In September a live system was launched at Bern University of Applied Sciences, originally for a Taler-enabled snack machine. In October RFC 8905 was published for the payto: internet URI scheme, allowing a standardised way to provide payments for internet end-users.

Their cooperation with the Swiss National Bank have resulted multiple papers on the relation of conventional national banks and electronic money, the privacy implications and various financial viability factors. There was also various papers about real-life problems and their handling by Taler, like anonymous age verification, relations to Central Banks and the Euro or using One-Time Passcodes.

In January 2024 the NGI launched a Europe-scope Taler project as a privacy-preserving payment system. In 2024 multiple auditor companies announced that they provide services for Taler payment providers. In May 2025, Taler operations entered Switzerland, coinciding with its 1.0 release.

== See also ==
- DigiCash
- Cryptocurrency
- Open source
