= Pkg-config =

Software development tool for querying library dependency information

pkg-config
- Original authors: James Henstridge; rewritten by Havoc Pennington
- Developer: Tollef Fog Heen / freedesktop.org
- Initial release: 2000; 26 years ago or earlier
- Stable release: 0.29.2 / March 20, 2017; 9 years ago
- Written in: C
- Operating system: Unix-like
- Type: Programming tool
- License: GNU GPL
- Website: www.freedesktop.org/wiki/Software/pkg-config/
- Repository: gitlab.freedesktop.org/pkg-config/pkg-config

pkg-config is a software development tool that queries information about libraries from a local, file-based database for the purpose of building a codebase that depends on them. It allows for sharing a codebase in a cross-platform way by using host-specific library information that is stored outside of yet referenced by the codebase. This indirection allows the codebase to build on a host without encoding host-specific library information in the codebase.

The tool is invoked via its command line interface (CLI), and it reports library information via standard output. Some information, such as version information, is more useful to the programmer. Other information, such as command-line options (flags), is more useful to build tools such as a compiler and a linker.

The tool was originally designed for Linux, and is now also available for BSD, Windows, macOS, and Solaris. The first implementation was written in shell script. Later, it was rewritten in C leveraging GLib.

== Database ==
To enable use of the tool, a referenced library must have a corresponding .pc file stored in the file system location designated for that purpose (the location varies by system). This file should be stored as part of the installation process as handled by RPM, deb, or other packaging system or by compiling from source code.

A .pc file contains various information such as the location of header files, library binaries and various descriptive information. It may also include a list of dependent libraries that programs using the library need to use.

== Example ==
The following example .pc file defines information for libpng. It starts with defining variables that are used throughout the rest of the file. It includes descriptive information including name "libpng" and version "1.2.8". The Cflags entry defines an option that the C preprocessor uses to locate the library's header files – in /usr/local/include/libpng12. The Libs entry defines options that define the location of library binaries, /usr/local/lib, and identify which library binary files to link.

prefix=/usr/local
exec_prefix=${prefix}
libdir=${exec_prefix}/lib
includedir=${exec_prefix}/include
 
Name: libpng
Description: Loads and saves PNG files
Version: 1.2.8
Libs: -L${libdir} -lpng12 -lz
Cflags: -I${includedir}/libpng12

The following is an example build command that uses this file to specify options to gcc. The output of command pkg-config --libs --cflags libpng is passed to gcc via its command line interface.

$ gcc -o test test.c $(pkg-config --libs --cflags libpng)

== Alternative implementations ==
Notable variants of pkg-config:

- pkgconf – Re-write to eliminate GLib dependency; default (instead of pkg-config) on linux and BSD distributions from many vendors, including Alpine Linux, Arch Linux, CentOS 8+, Debian, Fedora, FreeBSD, Mageia 7+, Manjaro and NetBSD
- u-config – First-class Windows support
- PkgConfig – Written in Perl
- ruby-gnome/pkg-config – Written in Ruby
