= Bryan Cantrill =

American computer scientist (born 1973)

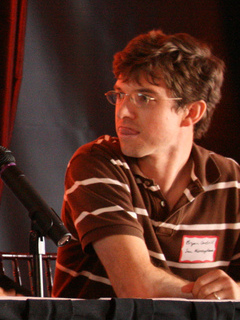
- Cantrill in 2007
- Born: December 1973 (age 52)
- Education: Brown University (B.S.)
- Occupation: CTO at Oxide Computer Company
- Known for: DTrace

Bryan McDowell Cantrill (born December 1973) is an American software engineer who worked at Sun Microsystems and later at Oracle Corporation following its acquisition of Sun. He left Oracle on July 25, 2010, to become the Vice President of Engineering at Joyent, transitioning to Chief Technology Officer at Joyent in April 2014, until his departure on July 31, 2019. He is now the co-founder and CTO of Oxide Computer company.

== Career ==
Cantrill was born in Vermont, later moving to Colorado, where he attained the rank of Eagle Scout. He studied computer science at Brown University, spending two summers at QNX Software Systems doing kernel development. Upon completing his B.Sc. in 1996, he immediately joined Sun Microsystems to work with Jeff Bonwick in the Solaris Performance Group.

In 2005, Bryan Cantrill was named one of the 35 Top Young Innovators by Technology Review, MIT's magazine. Cantrill was included in the TR35 list for his development of DTrace, a function of the OS Solaris 10 that provides a non-invasive means for real-time tracing and diagnosis of software. Sun technologies and technologists, including DTrace and Cantrill, also received an InfoWorld Innovators Award that year. In 2006, "The DTrace trouble-shooting software from Sun was chosen as the Gold winner in The Wall Street Journal's 2006 Technology Innovation Awards contest." In 2008, Cantrill, Mike Shapiro and Adam Leventhal were recognized with the USENIX Software Tools User Group (STUG) award for "the provision of a significant enabling technology."

Together with Shapiro and Leventhal, Cantrill founded Fishworks, a stealth project within Sun Microsystems which produced the Sun Storage 7000 Unified Storage Systems.

He left Oracle on July 25, 2010, to become the Vice President of Engineering at Joyent. He announced his transition to being Chief Technology Officer at Joyent in April 2014, and held that position until announcing his departure as of July 31, 2019. He is now the co-founder and CTO of Oxide Computer company.

He was a member of the ACM Queue Editorial Board.

== Articles ==
- Bryan Cantrill (February 1, 2006). "Hidden in Plain Sight". ACM Queue. 4 (1): 26–36. doi:10.1145/1117389.1117401.
- Bryan Cantrill, Jeff Bonwick (September 1, 2008). "Real-World Concurrency". ACM Queue. 6 (5): 16–25. doi:10.1145/1454456.1454462.
- Bryan M. Cantrill, Michael W. Shapiro and Adam H. Leventhal (June 10, 2004). "Dynamic Instrumentation of Production Systems". Proceedings of the 2004 USENIX Annual Technical Conference.
- Bryan M. Cantrill, Thomas W. Doeppner (August 15, 1996). "ThreadMon: A Tool for Monitoring Multithreaded Program Performance". 30th Hawaii International Conference on System Sciences (HICSS) Volume 1: Software Technology and Architecture. Hawaii International Conference on System Sciences.
