= Painted blue =

In computing, blue paint refers to the mark given to preprocessing tokens by the C preprocessor that temporarily disables expansion of those tokens. A token is said to be painted blue when it has been disabled in this way. While the original author of the term is disputed, Derek Jones states that it came about as a reference to blue ink used by the C committee.
