= LTTV =

LTTV may stand for:

- LTTng Viewer
- Lyons Township Television
