= PL/I preprocessor =

The PL/I preprocessor is the preprocessor for the PL/I computer programming language. The preprocessor interprets a subset of the full PL/I language to perform source file inclusion, conditional compilation, and macro expansion.

The preprocessor language has a PL/I-like syntax with preprocessor statements and preprocessor procedures prefixed with a percent symbol (%). Listing-control statements, which supply formatting commands for the compiler listing, are usually considered preprocessor statements and also begin with %. Preprocessor statements are imbedded in and operate on input text. The input text is normally a PL/I program, but is agnostic to the grammar of PL/I, so the preprocessor can also be used independently to process other kinds of text files.

The preprocessor is not specified as part of standard PL/I, but most PL/I implementations accept the language of the IBM preprocessor.

== Including files ==
The %INCLUDE preprocessor statement is used to include the text of another file, which may also contain preprocessor directives. The latest IBM compilers also provide an %XINCLUDE directive, which has the effect of including the specified file only if it has not already been included. %INSCAN and %XINSCAN operate similarly, except that the name of the file to be included is specified by a preprocessor expression.

== Listing control ==
Listing control statements provide instructions for formatting both the listing generated by the preprocessor and the listing generated by the compiler.

- %PRINT; causes the printing of listings of the following text to be started or resumed.
- %NOPRINT; causes the printing of the listings of the following text to be suppressed.
- %PAGE; causes a new page to be started in the listings.
- %SKIP [(n)]; causes n lines to be skipped in the listings. If n is omitted the default is one line.
- %PUSH, %POP save and restore the current status of %PRINT/%NOPRINT on a pushdown stack and restore it, respectively.

== Preprocessor operation ==
The preprocessor operates by scanning the input text and recognizing declared preprocessor names, also called preprocessor identifiers. The text is copied to the preprocessor output with the preprocessor names replaced with their current values. The name may represent a call to a preprocessor procedure (macro). Replacement text may be rescanned by the preprocessor for possible additional replacement.

=== Preprocessor data types ===
Preprocessor data may be declared to be CHARACTER, a character string with no maximum length, or FIXED an integer number of up to five decimal digits. A preprocessor builtin is a predefined procedure operating on preprocessor data. A preprocessor expression is an expression consisting only of preprocessor names, references to preprocessor procedures or builtins, and decimal or character constants. There are no BIT variables, but a BIT result may be obtained by comparison. The expression in %IF evaluates to BIT. All PL/I operators are allowed except exponentiation.

=== Preprocessor statements ===
- %DECLARE establishes an identifier as a preprocessor variable, either CHARACTER or FIXED.
- %assignment assigns a value to a preprocessor identifier.
- %ACTIVATE makes a preprocessor identifier active, that is, eligible for replacement when encountered in the input text.
- %DEACTIVATE makes a preprocessor ineligible for replacement.
- %DO heads a preprocessor DO-group, which is used to group statements and possibly specify iteration. A preprocessor DO-group can contain any combination of preprocessor statements and input text.
- %PROCEDURE heads a preprocessor procedure, a set of preprocessor statements that functions as a macro returning a value when its name is encountered in the input text.
- %SELECT heads a preprocessor SELECT-group.
- %END terminates a preprocessor DO-group, SELECT-group, or preprocessor procedure.
- %GOTO (or %GO TO) causes the preprocessor to continue its scan at the specified preprocessor label, either a preprocessor statement or an arbitrary point in the input text.
- %IF controls the flow of the preprocessor scan according to the value of a preprocessor expression.

 %IF preprocessor-expression
 %THEN preprocessor unit1
 %ELSE preprocessor-unit2

The preprocessor-units can be any single preprocessor statement or a preprocessor DO-group.

- %ITERATE transfers control to the %END of the containing preprocessor DO-group, ending the current iteration and beginning the next if needed.
- %LEAVE terminates any remaining iterations of the containing preprocessor DO-group transfers control to the %END.
- %NOTE generates a user-specified preprocessor diagnostic message.
- %null is a preprocessor statement consisting only of an optional statement label and a semicolon (;). It does nothing, but serves as a place-holder where a required statement is not needed.
- %REPLACE allows immediate replacement of a name by a character or fixed expression. The name does not have to be a declared preprocessor identifier.

=== Preprocessor procedures ===
A preprocessor procedure is a subroutine executed by the preprocessor. The procedure is delimited by %PROCEDURE and %END statements and can contain only preprocessor statements, without the leading %. It is invoked as a function reference from open code, outside of any preprocessor procedure, or from another preprocessor procedure, and returns a CHARACTER or FIXED value. When the procedure is invoked from open code the arguments are passed by name, that is they are interpreted as character strings delimited by commas or a right parenthesis, all leading, trailing, or embedded blanks are significant and considered part of the argument.

==== ANSWER statement ====
A preprocessor procedure that does not have the RETURNS attribute may use the ANSWER statement to emit text.

==== RETURN statement ====
A preprocessor procedure that has the RETURNS attribute may use the RETURN statement to return a value to the caller.

== Preprocessor built-ins ==
There can be considerable difference in the built-ins provided among preprocessors of various PL/I compilers.

These are the built-ins for IBM's PL/I for MVS and VM compiler.

- COMPILETIME — returns the date and time of compilation as a character string such as "15 SEP 12 15:30:00" for September 15, 2012 3:30PM (local time).
- COUNTER — returns a character string containing a number that is "00001" for the first call to COUNTER and increases by one for each subsequent call.
- INDEX — same as PL/I builtin INDEX.
- LENGTH — same as PL/I builtin LENGTH.
- PARMSET — PARMSET(p) returns '1'b if the argument p was set in the current call to this preprocessor procedure, otherwise '0'b.
- SUBSTR — same as PL/I builtin SUBSTR.

These are the built-ins for Enterprise PL/I for z/OS 6.2.

- COLLATE
- COMMENT
- COMPILEDATE
- COMPILETIME
- COPY
- COPYRIGHT
- COUNTER
- DIMENSION
- HBOUND
- INDEX
- LBOUND
- LENGTH
- LOWERCASE
- MACCOL
- MACLMAR
- MACNAME
- MACRMAR
- MAX
- MIN
- PARMSET
- QUOTE
- REPEAT
- SERVICE
- SUBSTR
- SYSDIMSIZE
- SYSOFFSETSIZE
- SYSPARM
- SYSPOINTERSIZE
- SYSTEM
- SYSVERSION
- TRANSLATE
- TRIM
- UPPERCASE
- VERIFY

Some of these provide for type introspection.

== Example ==
The following example for IBM PL/I for OS/2 illustrates the use of a preprocessor procedure to implement a C-like write statement for PL/I. The procedure would be called by coding the statement uwrite file(filename) from(varying_string) count(byte_count); Byte_count is optional and defaults to the length of varying_string if omitted.

 %uwrite:
 procedure keys (File, From, Count);

 dcl (File, From, Count, Number, Size) char;

 if parmset(File) & parmset(From) then; else do;
    note ('FILE and FROM must be specified!', 12);
    return;
    end;

 if parmset(Count)
    then Size = 'min(length(' || From || '), ' || Count || ')';
    else Size = 'length(' || From || ')';

 Number = Counter();
 ans ('do;');
 ans ('dcl Count' || Number || ' fixed bin (15);' ) skip;
 ans ('Count' || Number || ' = filewrite('
                        || File
                        || ', ptradd(addr(' || From || '), 2)'
                        || ', ' || Size
                        || ');') skip;
 ans ('end;') skip;

 %end;
 %act uwrite;

The statement uwrite file(file_name) from(var_str) count(64); generates the following:

 do;
 dcl Count00001 fixed bin (15);
 Count00001 = filewrite(file_name, ptradd(addr(var_str), 2), min(length(var_str), 64));
 end;

== Evolution ==
A 1964 report on "NPL", as PL/I was called at the time, provided that macro procedures, identified by the keyword MACRO, could use the complete facilities of the language. The following compile-time statements were allowed in open code:

- %DECLARE – both fixed-length and varying character strings were defined.
- %assignment
- %null statement
- %IF compile_time_comparison THEN unit [ELSE unit] – this causes one or the other unit to be included in the source.
- %GOTO

"NPL" as defined in this manual was never implemented.

In 1965 an update to IBM's PL/I Language specification defined an even less ambitious preprocessor language. All mention of preprocessor procedures was omitted. The following compile-time statements were specified:

- %DECLARE
- %assignment
- %null statement
- %IF compile_time_comparison THEN GOTO label – No ELSE clause was defined.
- %GOTO

This language specification was again never implemented, however a 1966 revision of this manual restored preprocessor procedures with the now-current %PROCEDURE ... %END syntax and brought the specification close to what was actually included in PL/I(F). Fixed-length character variables were gone. New statements added were:

- %ACTIVATE
- %DEACTIVATE
- %DO [preprocessor_variable = preprocessor_expression TO preprocessor_expression [BY preprocessor_expression]]
- RETURN in a compile-time procedure only.
- %INCLUDE
- %IF – the %IF compile_time_comparison %THEN unit [%ELSE unit] was restored.

A single compile-time builtin, SUBSTR, was added.

Also in 1966 Robert Rosin published a pair of articles discussing development of the preprocessor. This development was based in a "SHARE XXVI Memo" from earlier the same year and a paper by Mark Elson. Rosin credits MAD as the only previous example of a macro processor in a high-level language.

== See also ==
- C preprocessor
