= .cpp =

.cpp is a filename extension that may apply to:

- Files containing C Preprocessor directives
- Files containing C++ code
