= Dprobes =

Linux kernel analysis framework

Dprobes (Dynamic Probes) is a Linux kernel analysis framework built off of Kprobes, which features the ability to insert breakpoints and software probes dynamically into running code. It is licensed under the GNU GPLv2 licence.

== History ==
The IBM Linux Technology Centre first announced Dprobes on 16 August 2000 and would later ship with SUSE Linux Enterprise Server (SLES) and continue to do so until SLES 9.

With the release of Linux 2.6.9-rc2, Kprobes became a part of the mainline kernel on 2 November 2004, while Dprobes remained a separate patch. With several other tracing options being added to subsequent kernel version, such as SystemTap, some commercial Linux distributions moved away from using Dprobes.

== See also ==
- DTrace
- LTTng
