= Ktrace =

Software

ktrace
- Written in: C
- Operating system: BSD Unix and Mac OS X
- Available in: English
- Type: Tracing

ktrace is a utility included with certain versions of BSD Unix and Mac OS X that traces kernel interaction with a program and dumps it to disk for the purposes of debugging and analysis. Traced kernel operations include system calls, name translations, signal processing, and I/O.

Trace files generated by ktrace (named ktrace.out by default) can be viewed in human-readable form by using the kdump utility.

Since Mac OS X Leopard, ktrace has been replaced by DTrace. The identically-named ktrace program in recent macOS versions does not have the same functions as this utility.

== See also ==
- DTrace, Sun Microsystems's trace version, now running on OpenSolaris, FreeBSD, macOS, and Windows
- kdump (Linux), Linux kernel's crash dump mechanism, which internally uses kexec
- SystemTap
- trace on Linux, part of the Linux Trace Toolkit
