= X macro =

C/C++ programming idiom

X macros are an idiomatic usage of programming language macros for generating list-like structures of data or code. They are most useful when at least some of the lists cannot be composed by indexing, such as at compile time. They provide reliable maintenance of parallel lists whose corresponding items must be declared or executed in the same order.

Examples of such lists include initializing arrays, along with declaring enumeration constants and function prototypes, generating statement sequences and switch arms, etc.

Usage of X macros dates back to the 1960s. They remain useful in modern-day C and C++, yet are still relatively unknown.

== Implementation ==
An X macro application consists of two parts:

1. The definition of the list's elements.
2. Expansion(s) of the list to generate fragments of declarations or statements.

The list is defined by a macro or header file (named, LIST) which generates no code by itself, but merely consists of a sequence of invocations of a macro (classically named "X") with the elements' data. Each expansion of LIST is preceded by a definition of X with the syntax for a list element. The invocation of LIST expands X for each element in the list.

=== Example 1 ===
This example defines a list of variables, and automatically generates their declarations and a function to print them out.

First the list definition. The list entries could contain multiple arguments, but here only the name of the variable is used.

#define LIST_OF_VARIABLES \
    X(value1) \
    X(value2) \
    X(value3)

Then the list is expanded to generate the variable declarations:

#define X(name) int name;
LIST_OF_VARIABLES
#undef X

In a similar way, we can generate a function that prints the variables and their values:

void variables() {
#define X(name) printf("%s = %d\n", #name, name);
    LIST_OF_VARIABLES
#undef X
}

When run through the C preprocessor, the following code is generated. Line breaks and indentation have been added for ease of reading, even though they are not actually generated by the preprocessor:

int value1;
int value2;
int value3;

void variables() {
    printf("%s = %d\n", "value1", value1);
    printf("%s = %d\n", "value2", value2);
    printf("%s = %d\n", "value3", value3);
}

=== Example 2 with X macro as argument ===
This example aims to improve the readability of the X macro usage by:

1. Prefixing the name of the macro that defines the list with "FOR_";
2. Passing name of the worker macro into the list macro—this avoids both the need to define an obscurely named macro (X) and the need to undefine such macro;
3. Using the syntax for variadic macro arguments "..." in the worker macros to be able to accept more arguments than needed—this enables the maintainer of the code to add columns to the list without having to update all the macro definitions; and
4. Using the name "DO" as the macro name.

#define FOR_LIST_OF_VARIABLES(DO) \
    DO(id1, name1) \
    DO(id2, name2) \
    DO(id3, name3)

As above, execute this list to generate the variable declarations:

#define DEFINE_NAME_VAR(id, name, ...) int name;
FOR_LIST_OF_VARIABLES( DEFINE_NAME_VAR )

or declare an enumeration:

#define DEFINE_ENUMERATION(id, name, ...) name = id,
enum IdListType {
    FOR_LIST_OF_VARIABLES( DEFINE_ENUMERATION )
};

In a similar way, we can generate a function that prints the variables and their names:

void variables() {
    #define PRINT_NAME_AND_VALUE(id, name, ...) printf(#name " = %d\n", name);
    FOR_LIST_OF_VARIABLES( PRINT_NAME_AND_VALUE )
}
