= Adam Leventhal (programmer) =

American software engineer (born 1979)

Adam H Leventhal
- Born: 1979 (age 46–47); United States
- Education: Brown University (ScB)
- Occupation: Software Engineer at Oxide Computer Company
- Known for: DTrace
- Website: dtrace.org/blogs/ahl/

Adam Leventhal (born 1979) is an American software engineer, and one of the three authors of DTrace, a dynamic tracing facility in Solaris 10 which allows users to observe, debug and tune system behavior in real time.

== Biography ==
Adam joined the Solaris kernel development team after graduating cum laude from Brown University in 2001 with his B.Sc. in Math and Computer Science. DTrace was made available to the public in November 2003, and has since been used to find opportunities for performance improvements in production environments. In 2006, Adam and his DTrace colleagues were chosen Gold winners in The Wall Street Journal's Technology Innovation Awards contest by a panel of judges representing industry as well as research and academic institutions. A year after Sun Microsystems was acquired by Oracle Corp, Leventhal announced he was leaving the company. He served as Chief Technology Officer at Delphix from 2010 to 2016.

== Articles ==
- Cantrill, Bryan M.; Shapiro, Michael W.; Leventhal, Adam H. (June 2004). Dynamic Instrumentation of Production Systems. Proceedings of the 2004 USENIX Annual Technical Conference. Archived from the original on 2015-10-10.
- Leventhal, Adam (July 2008). "Flash Storage Memory". Communications of the ACM. 51 (7). New York, NY: Association for Computing Machinery: 47–51. doi:10.1145/1364782.1364796. Archived from the original on 2020-02-25.
- Leventhal, Adam (January 2010). "Triple-Parity RAID and Beyond". Communications of the ACM. 53 (1). New York, NY: Association for Computing Machinery: 58–63. doi:10.1145/1629175.1629194.
- Leventhal, Adam (May 2013). "A File System All Its Own". Communications of the ACM. 56 (5). New York, NY: Association for Computing Machinery: 64–67. doi:10.1145/2447976.2447991. S2CID 689738.
