= C preprocessor =

Text processor used with C and C++ and other programming tools

The C preprocessor (CPP) is a text file processor that is used with C, C++ and other programming tools. The preprocessor provides for file inclusion (often header files), macro expansion, conditional compilation, and line control. Although named in association with C and used with C, the preprocessor capabilities are not inherently tied to the C language. It can be and is used to process other kinds of files.

== Languages ==
C, C++, and Objective-C compilers provide a preprocessor capability, as it is required by the definition of each language. Some compilers provide extensions and deviations from the target language standard. Some provide options to control standards compliance. For instance, the GNU C preprocessor can be made more standards compliant by supplying certain command-line flags.

The C# programming language also allows for directives, though they are not read by a preprocessor and they cannot be used for creating macros, and are generally more intended for features such as conditional compilation. C# seldom requires the use of the directives, for example code inclusion does not require a preprocessor at all (as C# relies on a package/namespace system like Java, no code needs to be "included"). Similarly, F# and Visual J# are able to call these C# preprocessor directives.

The Haskell programming language also allows the usage of the C preprocessor.

Features of the preprocessor are encoded in source code as directives that start with #.

Although C++ source files are often named with a .cpp extension, that is an abbreviation for "C plus plus"; not C preprocessor.

== Preprocessor directives ==
The following languages have the following accepted directives.

=== C/C++ ===
The following tokens are recognised by the preprocessor in the context of preprocessor directives.

- #if
- #elif
- #else
- #endif
- #ifdef
- #ifndef
- #elifdef
- #elifndef
- #define
- #undef
- #include
- #embed
- #line
- #error
- #warning
- #pragma
- defined (follows a conditional directive; not actually a directive, but rather an operator)
- __has_include (operator)
- __has_cpp_attribute (operator)
- __has_c_attribute (operator)
- __has_embed (operator)

Until C++26, the C++ keywords import, export, and module were partially handled by the preprocessor as well.

The Haskell programming language also accepts C preprocessor directives, which is invoked by writing {-# LANGUAGE CPP #-} at the top of the file. The accepted preprocessor directives align with those in standard C/C++.

=== C# ===
Although C#, F# and Visual J# do not have a separate preprocessor, these directives are processed as if there were one.

- #nullable
- #if
- #elif
- #else
- #endif
- #define
- #undef
- #region
- #endregion
- #error
- #warning
- #line
- #pragma

C# does not use a preprocessor to handle these directives, and thus they are not handled or removed by a preprocessor, but rather directly read by the C# compiler as a feature of the language.

=== Objective-C ===
The following tokens are recognised by the preprocessor in the context of preprocessor directives.

- #if
- #elif
- #else
- #endif
- #ifdef
- #ifndef
- #define
- #undef
- #include
- #import
- #error
- #pragma
- defined

=== Swift ===
The following tokens, called "compiler directives", are detected by the compiler. They are not entirely the same as C preprocessor directives, but have the same structure and syntax.

- #if
  - arch(...)
  - canImport(...)
  - compiler(...)
  - hasAttribute(...)
  - hasFeature(...)
  - os(...)
  - swift(...)
  - targetEnvironment(...)
- #elseif
- #else
- #endif
- #available
- #unavailable
- #error
- #warning
- #file
- #fileID
- #filePath
- #line
- #column
- #function
- #dsohandle
- #sourceLocation
- #selector
- #keyPath
- #colorLiteral
- #imageLiteral
- #fileLiteral
- #stringify
- #externalMacro

== History ==
The preprocessor was introduced to C around 1973 at the urging of Alan Snyder and also in recognition of the usefulness of the file inclusion mechanisms available in BCPL and PL/I. The first version offered file inclusion via #include and parameterless string replacement macros via #define. It was extended shortly after, firstly by Mike Lesk and then by John Reiser, to add arguments to macros and to support conditional compilation.

The C preprocessor was part of a long macro-language tradition at Bell Labs, which was started by Douglas Eastwood and Douglas McIlroy in 1959.

== Phases ==
Preprocessing is defined by the first four (of eight) phases of translation specified in the C Standard.

1. Trigraph replacement: The preprocessor replaces trigraph sequences with the characters they represent. This phase was removed in C23 following the steps of C++17.
2. Line splicing: Physical source lines that are continued with escaped newline sequences are spliced to form logical lines.
3. Tokenization: The preprocessor breaks the result into preprocessing tokens and whitespace. It replaces comments with whitespace.
4. Macro expansion and directive handling: Preprocessing directive lines, including file inclusion and conditional compilation, are executed. The preprocessor simultaneously expands macros and, since the 1999 version of the C standard, handles _Pragma operators.

== Features ==
=== File inclusion ===
There are two directives in the C preprocessor for including contents of files:

- #include, used for directly including the contents of a file in-place (typically containing code of some kind)
- #embed, used for directly including or embedding the contents of a binary resource in-place

==== Code inclusion ====
To include the content of one file into another, the preprocessor replaces a line that starts with #include with the content of the file specified after the directive. The inclusion may be logical in the sense that the resulting content may not be stored on disk and certainly is not overwritten to the source file. The file being included need not contain any sort of code, as this directive will copy the contents of whatever file is included in-place, but the most typical use of #include is to include a header file (or in some rarer cases, a source file).

In the following example code, the preprocessor replaces the line #include <stdio.h> with the content of the standard library header file named 'stdio.h' in which the function printf() and other symbols are declared.

#include <stdio.h>

int main(void) {
    printf("Hello, World!\n");
    return 0;
}

In this case, the file name is enclosed in angle brackets to denote that it is a system file. For a file in the codebase being built, double-quotes are used instead. The preprocessor may use a different search algorithm to find the file based on this distinction.

For C, a header file is usually named with a .h extension. In C++, the convention for file extension varies with common extensions .h and .hpp. But the preprocessor includes a file regardless of the extension. In fact, sometimes code includes .c or .cpp files.

To prevent including the same file multiple times, which often leads to a compiler error, a header file typically contains an #include guard or if supported by the preprocessor #pragma once to prevent multiple inclusion.

==== Binary resource inclusion ====
C23 and C++26 introduce the #embed directive for binary resource inclusion, which allows including the content of a binary file into a source even if it is not valid C code. This allows binary resources (like images) to be included into a program without requiring processing by external tools like xxd -i and without the use of string literals, which have a length limit on MSVC. Similarly to xxd -i, the directive is replaced by a comma separated list of integers corresponding to the data of the specified resource. More precisely, if an array of type unsigned char is initialized using an #embed directive, the result is the same as-if the resource was written to the array using fread (unless a parameter changes the embed element width to something other than CHAR_BIT). Apart from the convenience, #embed is also easier for compilers to handle, since they are allowed to skip expanding the directive to its full form due to the as-if rule.

The supported parameters are:

- limit
- offset
- prefix
- suffix
- if_empty

The file to embed is specified the same as for #include – either with brackets or double quotes. The directive also allows certain parameters to be passed to it to customize its behavior. The C standard defines some parameters and implementations may define additional. The limit parameter is used to limit the width of the included data. It is mostly intended to be used with "infinite" files like urandom. The prefix and suffix parameters allow for specifying a prefix and suffix to the embedded data. Finally, the if_empty parameter replaces the entire directive if the resource is empty. In C, all standard parameters can be surrounded by double underscores, just like standard attributes on C23, for example __prefix__ is interchangeable with prefix, however this is not the case in C++. Implementation-defined parameters use a form similar to attribute syntax (e.g., vendor::attr) but without the square brackets. While all standard parameters require an argument to be passed to them (e.g., limit requires a width), this is generally optional and even the set of parentheses can be omitted if an argument is not required, which might be the case for some implementation-defined parameters. C++29 adds an offset parameter to #embed.

constexpr char ICON_DISPLAY_DATA[] = {
    #embed "art.png"
};

// specify any type which can be initialized form integer constant expressions will do
constexpr char RESET_BLOB[] = {
    #embed "data.bin"
};

// attributes work just as well
alignas(8) constexpr char ALIGNED_DATA_STRING[] = {
    #embed "attributes.xml"
};

int main() {
    return
#embed </dev/urandom> limit(1)
    ;
}

=== Conditional compilation ===
Conditional compilation is supported via the if-else core directives #if, #else, #elif, and #endif and with contraction directives #ifdef and #ifndef, which stand for #if defined(...) and #if !defined(...), respectively. In the following example code, the printf() call is only included for compilation if VERBOSE is defined.

#ifdef VERBOSE
printf("trace message");
#endif

The following demonstrates more complex logic:

#if !(defined __LP64__ || defined __LLP64__) || defined _WIN32 && !defined _WIN64
// code for a 32-bit system
#else
// code for a 64-bit system
#endif

=== Macro string replacement ===
==== Object-like ====
A macro specifies how to replace text in the source code with other text. An object-like macro defines a token that the preprocessor replaces with other text. It does not include parameter syntax and therefore cannot support parameterization. The following macro definition associates the text 1 / 12 with the token VALUE:

#define VALUE 1 / 12

==== Function-like ====
A function-like macro supports parameters, although the parameter list can be empty. The following macro definition associates the expression (A + B) with the token ADD that has parameters A and B.

#define ADD(A, B) (A + B)

A function-like macro declaration cannot have whitespace between the token and the first, opening parenthesis. If whitespace is present, the macro is interpreted as object-like with everything starting at the first parenthesis included in the replacement text.

==== Expansion ====
The preprocessor replaces each token of the code that matches a macro token with the associated replacement text in what is known as macro expansion. Note that text of string literals and comments is not parsed as tokens and is therefore ignored for macro expansion. For a function-like macro, the macro parameters are also replaced with the values specified in the macro reference. For example, ADD(VALUE, 2) expands to 1 / 12 + 2.

==== Variadic ====
A variadic macro (introduced with C99) accepts a varying number of arguments, which is particularly useful when wrapping functions that accept a variable number of parameters, such as printf.

==== Order of expansion ====
Function-like macro expansion occurs in the following stages:

1. Stringification operations are replaced with the textual representation of their argument's replacement list (without performing expansion).
2. Parameters are replaced with their replacement list (without performing expansion).
3. Concatenation operations are replaced with the concatenated result of the two operands (without expanding the resulting token).
4. Tokens originating from parameters are expanded.
5. The resulting tokens are expanded as normal.

This may produce surprising results:

#define HE HI
#define LLO _THERE
#define HELLO "HI THERE"
#define CAT(a,b) a##b
#define XCAT(a,b) CAT(a,b)
#define CALL(fn) fn(HE,LLO)
CAT(HE, LLO) // "HI THERE", because concatenation occurs before normal expansion
XCAT(HE, LLO) // HI_THERE, because the tokens originating from parameters ("HE" and "LLO") are expanded first
CALL(CAT) // "HI THERE", because this evaluates to CAT(a,b)

=== Undefine macro ===
A macro definition can be removed from the preprocessor context via #undef such that subsequent reference to the macro token will not expand. For example:

#define VALUE 15

// do stuff with VALUE...

#undef VALUE
// token 'VALUE' no longer expands from here...

=== Predefined macros ===
The preprocessor provides some macro definitions automatically. The C standard specifies that __FILE__ expands to the name of the file being processed and __LINE__ expands to the number of the line that contains the directive. The following macro, DEBUGPRINT, formats and prints a message with the file name and line number.

#define DEBUGPRINT(_fmt, ...) printf("[%s:%d]: " _fmt, __FILE__, __LINE__, __VA_ARGS__)

For the example code below that is on line 30 of file util.c and for count 123, the output is: [util.c:30]: count=123.

DEBUGPRINT("count=%d\n", count);

The first C Standard specified that __STDC__ expand to "1" if the implementation conforms to the ISO standard and "0" otherwise and that __STDC_VERSION__ expand to a numeric literal specifying the version of the standard supported by the implementation. Standard C++ compilers support the __cplusplus macro. Compilers running in non-standard mode must not set these macros or must define others to signal the differences.

Other standard macros include __DATE__, the current date, and __TIME__, the current time.

The second edition of the C Standard, C99, added support for __func__, which contains the name of the function definition within which it is contained, but because the preprocessor is agnostic to the grammar of C, this must be done in the compiler itself using a variable local to the function.

One little-known usage pattern of the C preprocessor is known as X-Macros. An X-Macro is a header file. Commonly, these use the extension .def instead of the traditional .h. This file contains a list of similar macro calls, which can be referred to as "component macros." The include file is then referenced repeatedly.

Many compilers define additional, non-standard macros. A common reference for these macros is the Pre-defined C/C++ Compiler Macros project, which lists "various pre-defined compiler macros that can be used to identify standards, compilers, operating systems, hardware architectures, and even basic run-time libraries at compile-time."

Most compilers targeting Microsoft Windows implicitly define _WIN32. This allows code, including preprocessor commands, to compile only when targeting Windows systems. A few compilers define WIN32 instead. For such compilers that do not implicitly define the _WIN32 macro, it can be specified on the compiler's command line, using -D_WIN32.

#ifdef __unix__
// __unix__ is usually defined by compilers targeting Unix systems
#include <unistd.h>
#elifdef _WIN32
// _WIN32 is usually defined by compilers targeting 32 or 64 bit Windows systems
#include <windows.h>
#endif

#ifdef __linux__
#define CURRENT_PLATFORM "Linux"
#elifdef __APPLE__
#define CURRENT_PLATFORM "Apple"
#elifdef _WIN32
#define CURRENT_PLATFORM "Windows"
#else
#define CURRENT_PLATFORM "Other"
#endif

The example code tests if a macro __unix__ is defined. If it is, the file <unistd.h> is then included. Otherwise, it tests if a macro _WIN32 is defined instead. If it is, the file <windows.h> is then included. Similarly, depending on which macro is defined, it defines CURRENT_PLATFORM to be a string with the name of the platform of the system.

=== Line control ===
The values of the predefined macros __FILE__ and __LINE__ can be set for a subsequent line via the #line directive. In the code below, __LINE__ expands to 314 and __FILE__ to "pi.c".

#line 314 "pi.c"
printf("line=%d file=%s\n", __LINE__, __FILE__);

=== Operators ===
The preprocessor is capable of interpreting operators and evaluating very basic expressions, such as integer constants, arithmetic operators, comparison operators, logical operators, bitwise operations, the defined operator, and the # stringificafion operator. This allows the preprocessor to make evaluations such as:

// if X equals 10, the preprocessor sees #if 10 == 10
#if X == 10

==== Defined operator ====
While the defined operator, denoted by defined is not a directive in its own right, if it is read within a directive, it is interpreted by the preprocessor and determines whether a macro has been defined.

The following are both accepted ways of invoking the defined operator.

#if defined(MY_MACRO)
#if defined MY_MACRO

==== Token stringification operator ====
The stringification operator (a.k.a. stringizing operator), denoted by # converts a token into a string literal, escaping any quotes or backslashes as needed. For definition:

#define STR(s) #s

STR(\n) expands to "\n" and STR(p = "foo\n";) expands to "p = \"foo\\n\";".

If stringification of the expansion of a macro argument is desired, two levels of macros must be used. For definition:

#define XSTR(s) STR(s)
#define STR(s) #s
#define FOO 4

STR(FOO) expands to "FOO" and XSTR(FOO) expands to "4".

A macro argument cannot be combined with additional text and then stringified. However, a series of adjacent string literals and stringified arguments, also string literals, are concatenated by the C compiler.

==== Token concatenation ====
The token pasting operator, denoted by ##, concatenates two tokens into one. For example, this can be used to simplify boilerplate by generating getter and setter methods, similar those of Project Lombok (in Java).

#define GETTER(type, method, name) \
    type get##method() const noexcept { \
        return this->name; \
    }

#define SETTER(type, method, name) \
    void set##method(type value) noexcept { \
        this->name = value; \
    }

using std::string;

class Student {
private:
    string name;
    int age;
    double gpa;
public:
    // constructors...

    GETTER(string, Name, name)
    SETTER(string, Name, name)
    GETTER(int, Age, age)
    SETTER(int, Age, age)
    GETTER(double, Gpa, gpa)
    SETTER(double, Gpa, gpa)

    // more methods...
};

=== Abort ===
Processing can be aborted via the #error directive. For example:

#if RUBY_VERSION == 190
#error Ruby version 1.9.0 is not supported
#endif

=== Warning ===
As of C23 and C++23, a warning directive, #warning, to print a message without aborting is provided. Some typical uses are to warn about the use of deprecated functionality. For example:

Prior to C23 and C++23, this directive existed in many compilers as a non-standard feature, such as the C compilers by GNU, Intel, Microsoft and IBM. Because it was non-standard, the warning macro had varying forms:

// GNU, Intel and IBM
#warning "Do not use ABC, which is deprecated. Use XYZ instead."

// Microsoft
#pragma message("Do not use ABC, which is deprecated. Use XYZ instead.")

== Non-standard features ==
=== #pragma ===
The #pragma directive is defined by standard languages, but with little or no requirements for syntax after its name so that compilers are free to define subsequent syntax and associated behavior. For instance, a pragma is often used to allow suppression of error messages, manage heap and stack debugging and so on.

C99 introduced a few standard pragmas, taking the form #pragma STDC ..., which are used to control the floating-point implementation. The alternative, macro-like form _Pragma(...) was also added.

One of the most popular uses of the #pragma directive is #pragma once, which behaves the same way an #include guard would, condensed into a single directive placed at the top of the file. Despite being non-standard, it is supported by most compilers.

=== Trigraphs ===
Many implementations do not support trigraphs or do not replace them by default.

=== Assertion ===
Some Unix preprocessors provided an assertion feature – which has little similarity to standard library assertions.

=== #include_next ===
GCC provides #include_next for chaining headers of the same name.

For example, if one overrides the file <stdio.h>, trying to include the standard library <stdio.h> would cause an infinite recursion of including if using #include, as it would re-include itself. #include_next solves this by including the next <stdio.h> found.

// override_stdio/stdio.h
#ifndef MY_STDIO_H
#define MY_STDIO_H

// Custom overrides
#define printf(...) my_custom_printf(__VA_ARGS__)

// Include the next stdio.h in the search path
#include_next <stdio.h>
#endif

=== #import ===
Unlike C and C++, Objective-C includes an #import directive that is like #include but results in a file being included only once – eliminating the need for include guards and #pragma once. It is a standard part of Objective-C.

#import <Foundation/Foundation.h>
#import "MyClass.h"

In Microsoft Visual C++ (MSVC), there also exists an #import preprocessor directive, used to import type libraries. It is a nonstandard directive.

#import "C:\\Program Files\\Common Files\\System\\ado\\msado15.dll" no_namespace rename("EOF", "ADOEOF")

These should not be confused with the C++ keyword import, which is used to import C++ modules (since C++20), and is not a preprocessor directive.

=== Null directive ===
The null directive, which consists only of the # character, alone on a single line, is a non-standard directive in Microsoft Visual C++. It has no effect.

=== #nullable ===
The #nullable directive in C# is used to enable and disable nullable reference types. To enable them, use #nullable enable, and #nullable disable to disable them.

#nullable enable

string? name = null; // OK
string fullName = null; // Warning: possible null assignment

#nullable disable

string test = null; // No warning

This directive does not exist in C/C++.

=== #region ===
The #region and #endregion directives in C# are used to expand/collapse sections of code in IDEs, and has no effect on actual compilation of the program. It is primarily used for code organisation and readability.

using System;

#region Helper methods

void Log(string message)
{
    Console.WriteLine(message);
}

#endregion

While this directive does not exist in C/C++, MSVC and Visual Studio instead have #pragma region and #pragma endregion. Thus the equivalent C++ code would be:

using std::string_view;

#pragma region Helper methods

void log(string_view message) {
    std::println(message);
}

#pragma endregion

=== #using ===
C++/CLI has the #using directive, which is used to import metadata into a program from a Microsoft Intermediate Language file (such as a .dll file).

#using <MyComponent.dll>
#using "AssemblyA.dll"
#using "AssemblyB.dll"

using namespace System;

public ref class B {
    public void Test(A a) {
        // ...
    }
};

int main(array<String^>^ args) {
    A a;
    B b;
    B.Test(a);
}

== Other uses ==
Traditionally, the C preprocessor was a separate development tool from the compiler with which it is usually used. In that case, it can be used separately from the compiler. Notable examples include use with the (deprecated) imake system and for preprocessing Fortran. However, use as a general purpose preprocessor is limited since the source code language must be relatively C-like for the preprocessor to parse it.

The GNU Fortran compiler runs the preprocessor in "traditional mode" before compiling Fortran code if certain file extensions are used. Intel offers a Fortran preprocessor, fpp, for use with the ifort compiler, which has similar capabilities.

The C preprocessor also works acceptably with most assembly languages and Algol-like languages. This requires that the language syntax not conflict with C preprocessor syntax, which means no lines starting with # and that double quotes, which the C preprocessor interprets as string literals and thus ignores, don't have syntactical meaning other than that. The "traditional mode" (acting like a pre-ISO C preprocessor) is generally more permissive and better suited for such use.

Some modern compilers such as the GNU C Compiler provide preprocessing as a feature of the compiler; not as a separate tool.

== Limitations ==
=== Text substitution limitations ===
Text substitution has a relatively high risk of causing a software bug as compared to other programming constructs.

In particular, C preprocessor macros lack syntactic awareness and fail to preserve lexical structure, unlike syntactic macros seen in Lisp-like languages, Scala, or Rust.

==== Hidden multiple evaluation ====
Consider the common definition of a MAX macro:

#define MAX(a, b) (((a) > (b)) ? (a) : (b))

The expressions represented by a and b are both evaluated two times due to macro expansion, but this aspect is not obvious in the code where the macro is referenced. If the actual expressions have constant value, then multiple evaluation is not problematic from a logic standpoint even though it can affect runtime performance. But if an expression evaluates to a different value on subsequent evaluation, then the result may be unexpected. For example, given int i = 1, j = 2;, the result of MAX(i, j) is 2. If a and b were only evaluated once, the result of MAX(i++, j++) would be the same, but with double evaluation the result is 3.

==== Hidden order of operation ====
Failure to bracket arguments can lead to unexpected results. For example, a macro to double a value might be written as:

#define DOUBLE(x) 2 * x

But DOUBLE(1 + 2) expands to 2 * 1 + 2, which due to order of operations evaluates to 4 when the expected is 6. To mitigate this problem, a macro should bracket all expressions and substitution variables:

#define DOUBLE(x) (2 * (x))

=== Not general purpose ===
The C preprocessor is not Turing-complete, but comes close. Recursive computations can be specified, but with a fixed upper bound on the amount of recursion performed. However, the C preprocessor is not designed to be, nor does it perform well as, a general-purpose programming language. As the C preprocessor does not have features of some other preprocessors, such as recursive macros, selective expansion according to quoting, and string evaluation in conditionals, it is very limited in comparison to a more general macro processor such as m4.

== Phase out ==
Due to its limitations and lack of type safety (as the preprocessor is completely oblivious to C/C++ grammar, performing only text substitutions), C and C++ language features have been added over the years to minimize the value and need for the preprocessor.

=== Constant ===
For a long time, a preprocessor macro provided the preferred way to define a constant value. An alternative has always been to define a const variable, but that results in consuming runtime memory. A newer language construct (since C++11 and C23), constexpr, allows for declaring a compile-time constant value that need not consume runtime memory.

// With preprocessor:
#define MAX_NUMBER_OF_RETRIES 3
#define EARTH_GRAVITATIONAL_ACCELERATION 9.8

// Using constexpr:
constexpr int MAX_NUMBER_OF_RETRIES = 3;
constexpr double EARTH_GRAVITATIONAL_ACCELERATION = 9.8;

=== Inline function ===
For a long time, a function-like macro was the only way to define function-like behavior that did not incur runtime function call overhead. Via the inline keyword and optimizing compilers that inline automatically, some functions can be invoked without call overhead.

// With preprocessor:
#define MAX(a, b) ((a) > (b) ? (a) : (b))

// With inline:
inline constexpr auto max(auto a, auto b) noexcept {
    return (a > b) ? a : b;
}

=== Import ===
The include directive limits code structure since it only allows including the content of one file into another. More modern languages support a module concept that has public symbols that other modules import – instead of including file content. Many contend that resulting code has reduced boilerplate and is easier to maintain since there is only one file for a module, not both a header and a body. C++20 adds modules, and an import statement that is not handled via preprocessing. Modules in C++ compile faster and link faster than traditional headers, and eliminate the necessity of #include guards or #pragma once. Until C++26, import, export, and module keywords were partially handled by the preprocessor.

// With include:
#include "wikipedia/examples/utils.h"

// With import:
import wikipedia.examples.utils;

For code bases that cannot migrate to modules immediately, C++ also offers "header units" as a feature, which allows header files to be imported in the same way a module would. Unlike modules, header units may emit macros, offering minimal breakage between migration. Header units are designed to be a transitional solution before totally migrating to modules. For instance, one may write import <string>; instead of #include <string>, or import "MyHeader.hpp"; instead of #include "MyHeader.hpp". Paradoxically, most build systems, such as CMake, do not currently support this feature.

In Clang, a non-standard module feature for C is offered, allowing importing headers as modules.

== See also ==
- C syntax
- C++ syntax
- C# syntax
- Make
- m4 (computer language)
- PL/I preprocessor

== Sources ==
- Ritchie, Dennis M. (March 1993). "The Development of the C Language". ACM SIGPLAN Notices. 28 (3). ACM: 201–208. doi:10.1145/155360.155580.
- Ritchie, Dennis M. (1993). "The Development of the C Language". The Second ACM SIGPLAN Conference on History of Programming Languages (HOPL-II). ACM. pp. 201–208. doi:10.1145/154766.155580. ISBN 0-89791-570-4.
