= IGSTK =

- Developer: Insight Software Consortium
- Initial release: 2003
- Stable release: 4.4 / 10 February 2011; 15 years ago
- Written in: C++
- Operating system: Cross-platform
- Type: Development Library
- License: BSD, BSD, Open Source
- Website: www.igstk.org
- Repository: igstk.org/IGSTK.git

The Image-Guided Surgery Toolkit (IGSTK: pronounced IGStick) is a software package oriented to facilitate the development of image-guided surgery applications.

IGSTK is an open-source software toolkit designed to enable biomedical researchers to rapidly prototype and create new applications for image-guided surgery. This toolkit provides functionalities that are commonly needed when implementing image-guided surgery applications, such as integration with optical and electromagnetic trackers, manipulation and visualization of DICOM datasets.

== History ==
The development of IGSTK was funded by the US National Institute of Biomedical Imaging and Bioengineering, one of the US National Institutes of Health NIH. Development started in 2003 as a collaboration between the ISIS Center at Georgetown University and Kitware. In 2004 a team from the CADDLab at the University of North Carolina at Chapel Hill joined the project. Atamai a firm dedicated to development of image-guided surgery toolkits, joined in 2005.

The project has been supported by several vendors of trackers.

== License ==
- IGSTK is distributed as open-source software, under a BSD license.
- It allows unrestricted use, including use in commercial products IGSTK License.
- The copyright of IGSTK is held by the Insight Software Consortium.

== See also ==
- ITK
- CMake
- CPack
- VTK
- 3DSlicer
- FLTK
- Qt (toolkit)

== Use in Other Projects ==
- CISST
- Slicer - IGSTK Integration
