= GIMIAS =

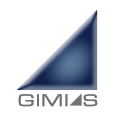

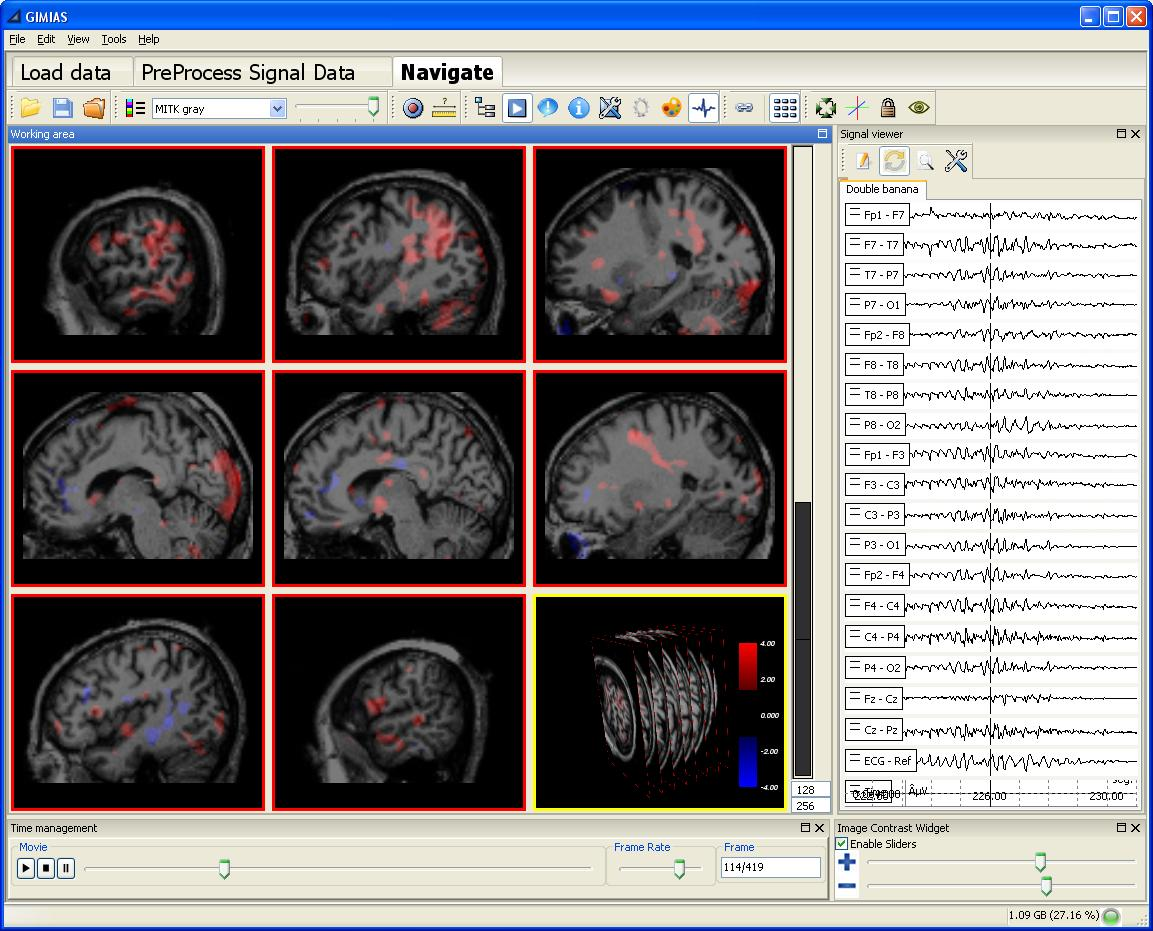
- GIMIAS GUI includes multislice view of multimodal biomedical images and signal navigation tools
- Stable release: 1.5.r4 / October 2012; 13 years ago
- Written in: C++
- Operating system: Windows, Linux
- Type: Scientific visualization and image computing
- License: BSD-style
- Website: gimias.org

GIMIAS is a workflow-oriented environment focused on biomedical image computing and simulation. The open-source framework is extensible through plug-ins and is focused on building research and clinical software prototypes. Gimias has been used to develop clinical prototypes in the fields of cardiac imaging and simulation, angiography imaging and simulation, and neurology

GIMIAS is being funded by several national and international projects like cvREMOD, euHeart or VPH NoE.

== About GIMIAS ==
GIMIAS stands for Graphical Interface for Medical Image Analysis and Simulation. GIMIAS provides a graphical user interface with all main data IO, visualization and interaction functions for images, meshes and signals. GIMIAS features include:

- DICOM browser and PACS connection
- Support for different imaging modalities
- Biomedical data visualization in 2D and 3D: multiplanar reformation, ortho slice view, multi slice view, volume rendering, X-ray rendering, maximum intensity projection
- Several input and output formats: DICOM, vtk, stl, Nifty, Analyze.
- Movie control: play, pause, speed control
- Multiple data objects: 2D DICOM images, 3D images, surface meshes, volumetric meshes, signals or annotations
- Image and surface mesh annotations: landmarks, measurements and regions of interest
- Clinical workflow navigation that can help the user to navigate from patient data to useful information for patient treatment.
- Other additional tools for image segmentation, mesh manipulation and signal navigation.

GIMIAS is a development framework that allows developers to create their own medical applications using different plug-ins that can be dynamically loaded and combined. The prototypes developed on GIMIAS can be verified by end users in real scenarios and with real data at early development stages.

Is developed using C++ language, has a plug-in architecture, and is cross-platform by means of the standard CMake tool. Is possible to integrate new libraries using CSnake tool and is based on common open source libraries like VTK, ITK, MITK, BOOST and wxWidgets. A plug-in can extend the framework adding new processing components, GUI components like toolbars or windows, new data processing types or new rendering libraries.

GIMIAS supports several types of plug-ins, starting from a simple DLL, a 3D Slicer compatible command line plug-in or a more complex GIMIAS plug-in with customized graphical interface. Automated GUI generation and extensible data object model allow to share plug-ins with other frameworks and empower interoperability.

The software is available on Windows and Linux, 64-bit and 32-bit.

== History ==
Initial versions of the open source framework was released by the end of 2009 (GIMIAS 0.6.15 was released in October 2009).

In 2010, more effort was done to empower the open source framework itself, providing more functionality like workflow manager, 3D Slicer plug-in compatibility, signal viewer and customizable views. GIMIAS version 0.8.1, 1.0.0, 1.1.0 and 1.2.0 were released during this year.

GIMIAS Team have collaborated with:

- cmgui team: to trial the use of the interim cmgui API from the GIMIAS software platform
- CTK group
- B3C group (MAF)

GIMIAS is one of the tools used in the Virtual Physiological Human.

== Clinical Prototypes ==
- AngioLab is a software tool developed within the GIMIAS framework and is part of a more ambitious pipeline for the integrated management of cerebral aneurysms. AngioLab currently includes four plug-ins: angio segmentation, angio morphology virtual stenting and virtual angiography. In December 2009, 23 clinicians completed an evaluation questionnaire about AngioLab. This activity was part of a teaching course held during the 2nd European Society for Minimally Invasive Neurovascular Treatment (ESMINT) Teaching Course held at the Universitat Pompeu Fabra, Barcelona, Spain. The Automated Morphological Analysis (angio morphology plug-in) and the Endovascular Treatment Planning (stenting plug-in) were evaluated. In general, the results provided by these tools were considered as relevant and as an emerging need in their clinical field.
- CardioLab: The CardioLab suite for GIMIAS allows performing an entire workflow from medical images to characterization and quantification of myocardial diseases and Cardiac Resynchronization Therapy (CRT) planning.
- FocusDET: Accurate localization of epileptogenic foci in intractable partial epilepsy is essential for assessing the possibility of surgery as a treatment. A specific software package was developed to locate the epileptogenic focus using Ictal and Inter-ictal SPECT images and MRI employing the SISCOM methodology. FocusDET was developed using GIMIAS facilities.
- QuantiDopa is a software that allows performing a semiautomatic quantification of the striatal uptake in neurotransmission SPECT studies of the dopaminergic system.
