= Vector Fabrics, B.V. =

Software development tools vendor

- Type: Private
- Industry: Embedded software development tools
- Founder: Martijn Rutten; Paul Stravers; Jos van Eijndhoven
- Headquarters: Zaltbommel, the Netherlands
- Products: Vector Fabrics Pareon
- Website: vectorfabrics.com multicoreprogramming.com

Vector Fabrics, B.V. was a software-development tools vendor originated from Eindhoven based in Zaltbommel, the Netherlands. They developed tools for programming multicore platforms. Vector Fabrics says to help software developers and OEMs that struggle to write error-free and efficient code for multicore and (heterogeneous) manycore processors.

== Products ==
Vector Fabrics' Pareon Profile is a predictive profiling tool based on dynamic analysis to explore opportunities and bottlenecks for parallel execution of C and C++ code. The product includes a model of the target platform (e.g. ARM Android) to predict the performance and power gains of a proposed code rewrite. It has been used a.o. to optimize Blink and Webkit, the engine underlying the Chrome browser, the Bullet Physics engine, the IdTech4 game engine underlying Doom 3, and a number of video codecs and image processing applications.

Vector Fabrics' Pareon Verify uses dynamic analysis to find bugs in C or C++ application code. It has been used to find bugs in various open source software projects like PicoTCP, VTK, Navit and YARP.

vfTasks is an open-source library for writing multi-threaded applications in C and C++. It includes APIs for various synchronization and parallel programming patterns.

== History ==
February 2007, Vector Fabrics was founded by three experts in multicore programming from NXP Semiconductors and Philips Research.

November 2012, Vector Fabrics was included in the EE Times 'Silicon 60' list of emerging startups.

June 2012, Vector Fabrics released Pareon Profile, a tool to help programmers optimize software for multicore platforms.

April 2013, Gartner selected Vector Fabrics as 'Cool Vendor in Embedded Systems & Software' in 2012.

May 2013, Vector Fabrics joined the Multicore Association (MCA).

May 2015, Vector Fabric moved from the center of Eindhoven, the Netherlands (Province of Brabant) to Zaltbommel, the Netherlands (Province of Gelderland).

October 2015 sees the public release of Pareon Verify, a tool to find software bugs via dynamic analysis.

Vector Fabrics was declared bankrupt in May, 2016.
