= 3D Slicer =

Image analysis and scientific visualization software

- Original author: The Slicer Community
- Stable release: 5.12.4 / September 10, 2026; 18 days ago
- Written in: C++, Python, Qt
- Operating system: Linux, macOS, Windows
- Size: 200MB
- Available in: English
- Type: Scientific visualization and image computing
- License: BSD-style
- Website: www.slicer.org
- Repository: github.com/Slicer/Slicer

3D Slicer (Slicer) is a free and open source software package for image analysis and scientific visualization. Slicer is used in a variety of medical applications, including autism, multiple sclerosis, systemic lupus erythematosus, prostate cancer, lung cancer, breast cancer, schizophrenia, orthopedic biomechanics, COPD, cardiovascular disease and neurosurgery.

== About ==
3D Slicer is a free open source software (BSD-style license) that is a flexible, modular platform for image analysis and visualization. 3D Slicer is extended to enable development of both interactive and batch processing tools for a variety of applications.

3D Slicer provides image registration, processing of DTI (diffusion tractography), an interface to external devices for image guidance support, and GPU-enabled volume rendering, among other capabilities. 3D Slicer has a modular organization that allows the addition of new functionality and provides a number of generic features.

The interactive visualization capabilities of 3D Slicer include the ability to display arbitrarily oriented image slices, build surface models from image labels, and hardware accelerated volume rendering. 3D Slicer also supports a rich set of annotation features (fiducials and measurement widgets, customized color maps).

Slicer's capabilities include:

- Handling DICOM images and reading/writing a variety of other formats
- Interactive visualization of volumetric Voxel images, polygonal meshes, and volume renderings
- Manual editing
- Fusion and co-registering of data using rigid and non-rigid algorithms
- Automatic image segmentation
- Analysis and visualization of diffusion tensor imaging data
- Tracking of devices for image-guided procedures.

Slicer is compiled for use on multiple computing platforms, including Windows, Linux, and macOS.

Slicer is distributed under a BSD style, free, open source license. The license has no restrictions on use of the software in academic or commercial projects. However, no claims are made on the software being useful for any particular task. It is entirely the responsibility of the user to ensure compliance with local rules and regulations. The developers state that Slicer is a research package that is not intended for clinical use, and that clinical users must obtain the necessary ethics or regulatory approvals.

== Image gallery ==
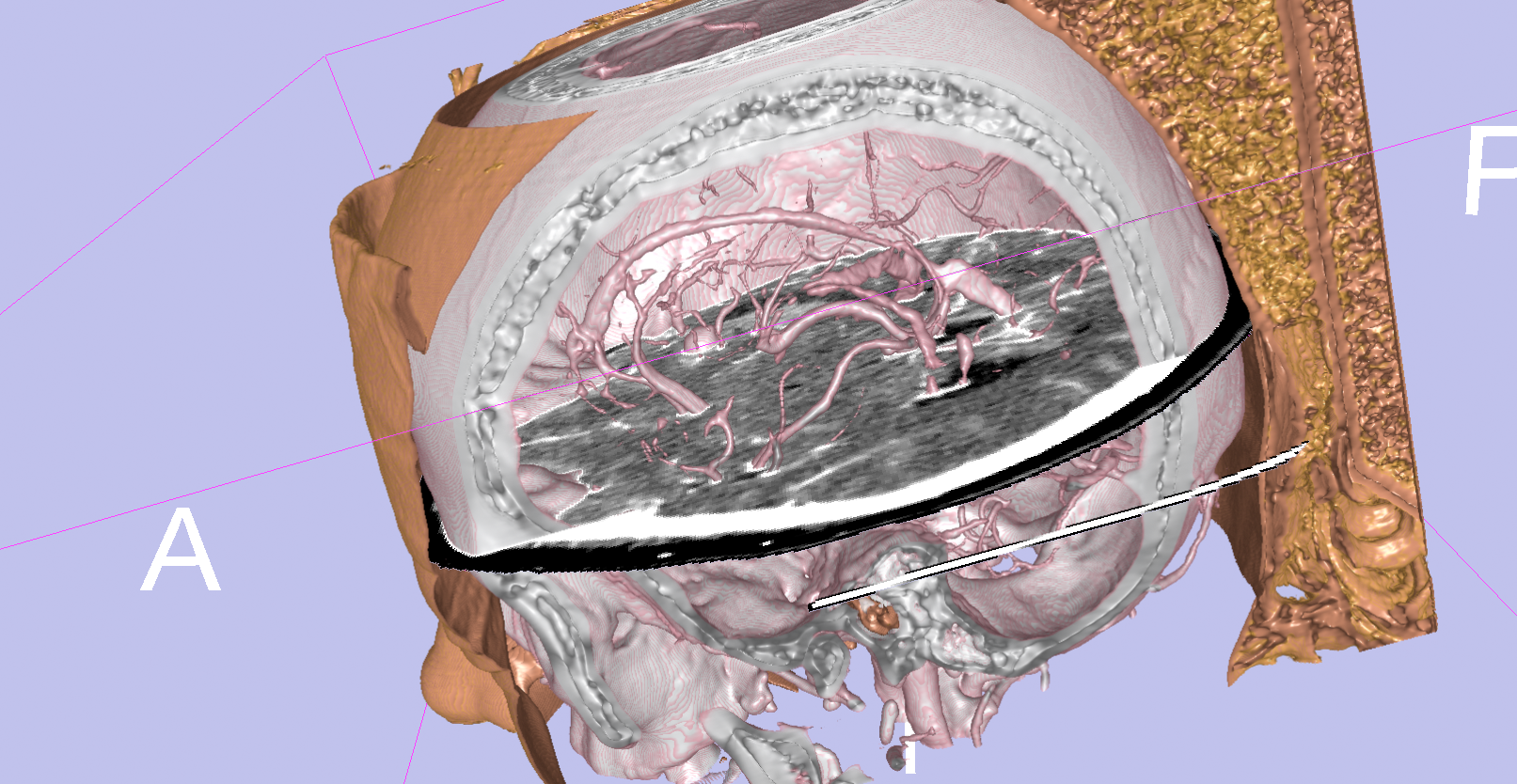
Hardware accelerated volume rendering with OpenGL.

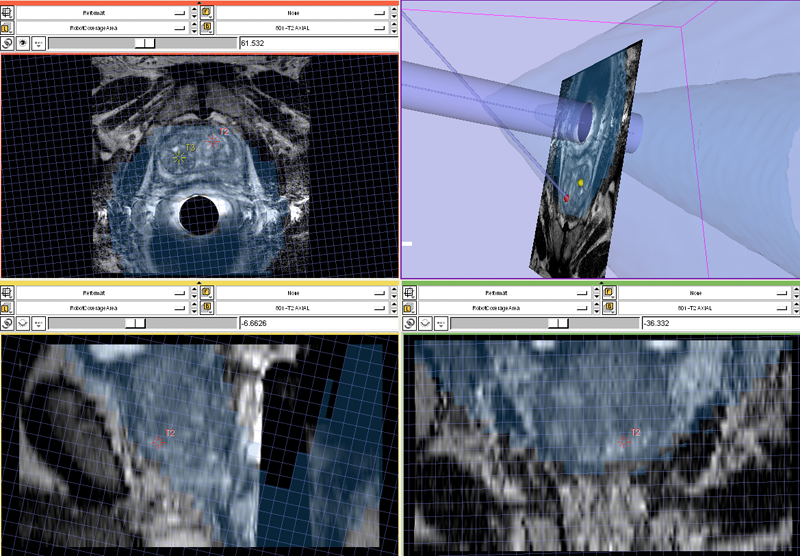
ProstateNav Module for MRI guided robot assisted biopsy of the prostate.

Left: 3D rendering. Right: Open MR system

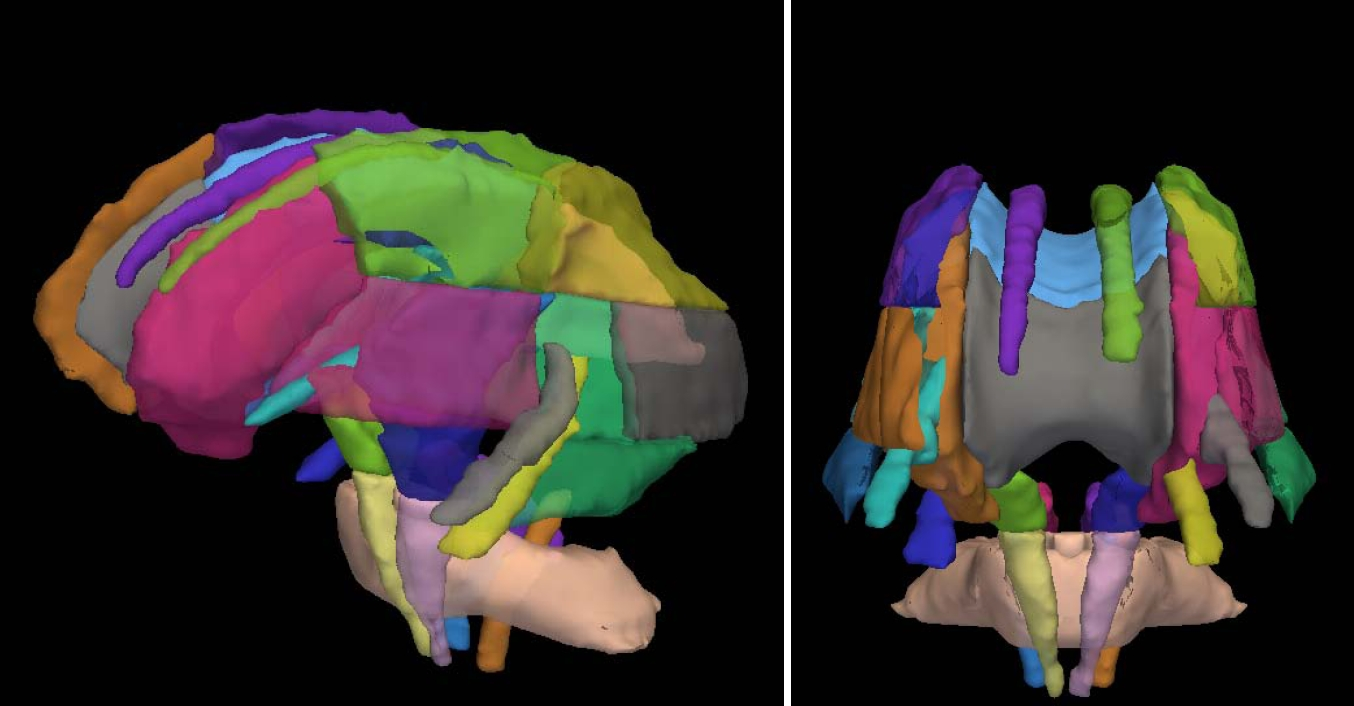
Visualization of some atlas-based ROIs which correspond to major anatomical fiber tracts. The atlas was provided as part of a download of DTI studio.

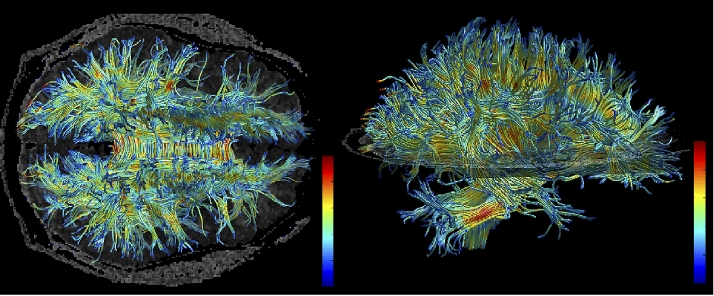
High resolution data acquired on 3-tesla magnet and post-processed using automated tracking procedure.

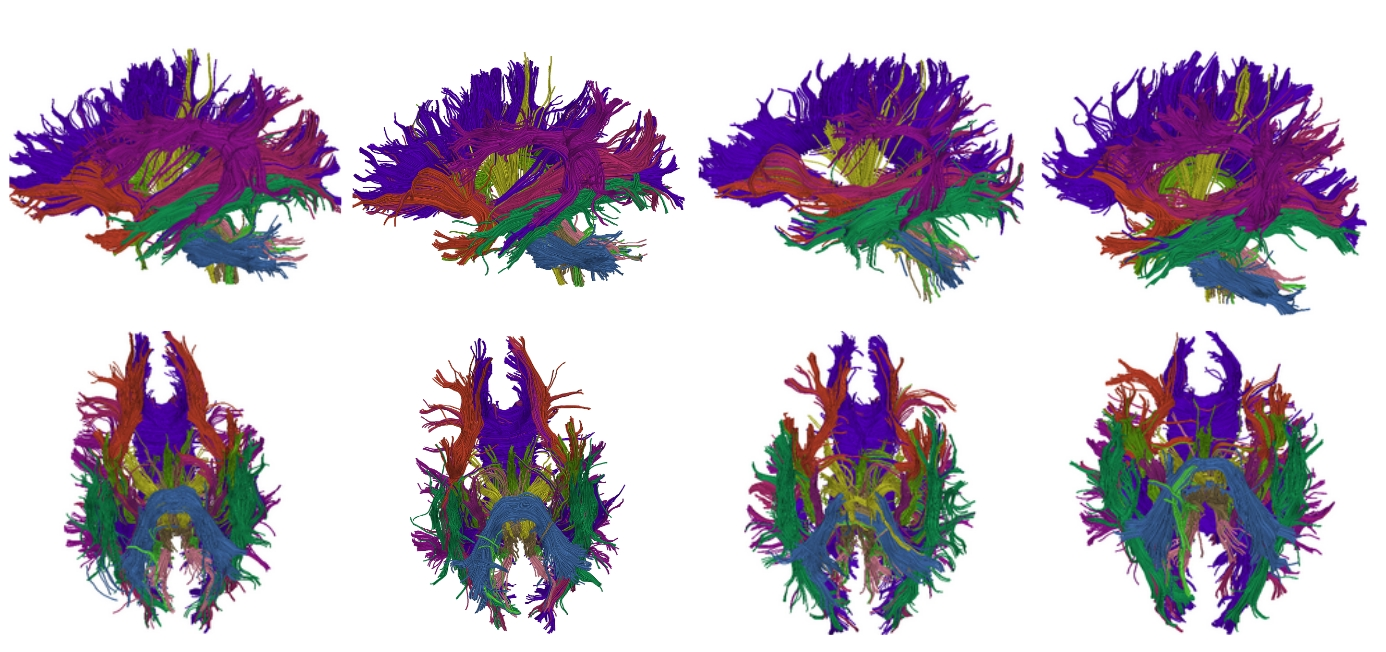
High-dimensional white matter atlas generation and group analysis: result of automatic segmentation of novel subjects.

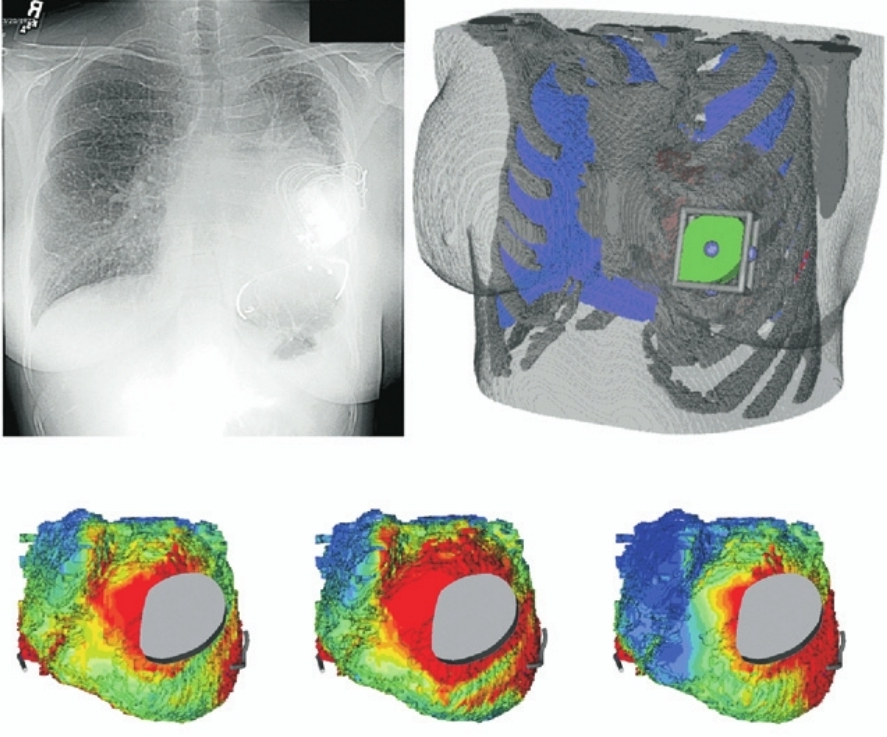
Patient-specific modeling in a patient with congenital heart disease.

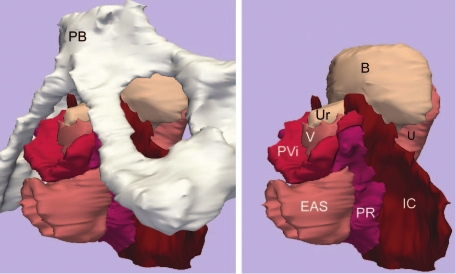
Left: Three-dimensional model of levator ani subdivisions including the pubic bone and pelvic viscera. Right: The same model without the pubic bone.

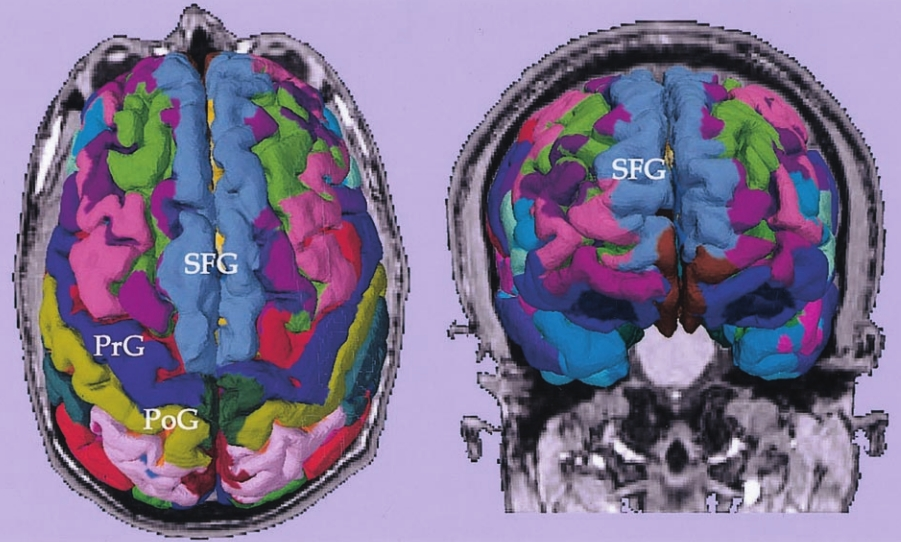
Cortical parcellations derived from SPGR images obtained from a tumor patient.

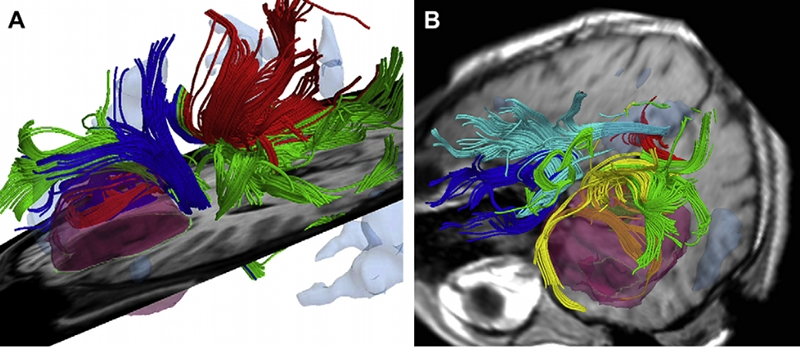
Intraoperative colocalization using iMRI images and 3-D Slicer software.

== History ==
Slicer started as a master's thesis project between the Surgical Planning Laboratory at the Brigham and Women's Hospital and the MIT Artificial Intelligence Laboratory in 1998. As per another record, Slicer emerged from several earlier projects in image visualization, surgical navigation and graphical user interfaces. David Gering presented the initial prototype in his 1999 master's thesis at MIT, building on earlier work at the MIT Artificial Intelligence Laboratory and the Surgical Planning Laboratory at Brigham and Women's Hospital. Steve Pieper then became chief architect, and Slicer has been developed under Ron Kikinis at the Surgical Planning Laboratory since 1999. 3D Slicer version 2 has been downloaded several thousand times. In 2007 a completely revamped version 3 of Slicer was released. The next major refactoring of Slicer was initiated in 2009, which transitioned the GUI of Slicer from using KWWidgets to Qt. Qt-enabled Slicer version 4 was released in 2011. As of 2022, Slicer 4 had been downloaded over one million times by users around the world.

Slicer software has enabled a variety of research publications, all aimed at improving image analysis.

This significant software project has been enabled by the participation of several large-scale NIH funded efforts, including the NA-MIC, NAC, BIRN, CIMIT, Harvard Catalyst and NCIGT communities. The funding support comes from several federal funding sources, including NCRR, NIBIB, NIH Roadmap, NCI, NSF and the DOD.

Slicer 5.0, released in July 2022, moved the application's scripting environment to Python 3 and added a web server module exposing a REST API and a DICOMweb interface. It also added extensions for AI-assisted segmentation, including MONAI Label and an NVIDIA annotation extension, along with automatic updating of extensions, infrastructure for translating the user interface, and more than 40 new extensions. The 5.12 series (July 2026) added support for building against Qt 6, a redesigned DICOM browser for large databases, and built-in support for additional DICOM object types such as segmentations and structured reports.

=== Extensions ===
Slicer's functionality can be expanded with extensions that users install through a built-in Extensions Manager. At the release of version 5.0 the catalog offered more than 150 extensions contributed by the community, and 22 more were added between versions 5.10 and 5.12. Examples include SlicerMorph, for morphometric analysis of specimen data from CT and MRI scans and 3D surface scans; SlicerRT, a toolkit for radiation therapy research; and SlicerHeart, for cardiac analysis and intervention planning.

== Users ==
Slicer's platform provides functionalities for segmentation, registration and three-dimensional visualization of multimodal image data, as well as advanced image analysis algorithms for diffusion tensor imaging, functional magnetic resonance imaging and image-guided radiation therapy. Standard image file formats are supported, and the application integrates interface capabilities to biomedical research software.

Slicer has been used in a variety of clinical research. In image-guided therapy research, Slicer is frequently used to construct and visualize collections of MRI data that are available pre- and intra-operatively to allow for the acquiring of spatial coordinates for instrument tracking. In fact, Slicer has already played such a pivotal role in image-guided therapy, it can be considered as growing up alongside that field, with over 200 publications referencing Slicer since 1998.

In addition to producing 3D models from conventional MRI images, Slicer has also been used to present information derived from fMRI (using MRI to assess blood flow in the brain related to neural or spinal cord activity), DTI (using MRI to measure the restricted diffusion of water in imaged tissue), and electrocardiography. For example, Slicer's DTI package allows the conversion and analysis of DTI images. The results of such analysis can be integrated with the results from analysis of morphologic MRI, MR angiograms and fMRI. Other uses of Slicer include paleontology and neurosurgery planning.

There is an active community at Slicer's Discourse server.

== Developers ==
The Slicer Developer Orientation offers resources for developers new to the platform. Slicer development is coordinated on the Slicer Discourse forum, and a summary of development statistics is available on Ohloh.

3D Slicer is built on VTK, a pipeline-based graphical library that is widely used in scientific visualization and ITK, a framework widely used for the development of image segmentation and image registration. In version 4, the core application is implemented in C++, and the API is available through a Python wrapper to facilitate rapid, iterative development and visualization in the included Python console. The user interface is implemented in Qt, and may be extended using either C++ or Python.

Slicer supports several types of modular development. Fully interactive, custom interfaces may be written in C++ or Python. Command-line programs in any language may be wrapped using a light-weight XML specification, from which a graphical interface is automatically generated.

For modules that are not distributed in the Slicer core application, a system is available to automatically build and distribute for selective download from within Slicer. This mechanism facilitates the incorporation of code with different license requirements from the permissive BSD-style license used for the Slicer core.

The Slicer build process utilizes CMake to automatically build prerequisite and optional libraries (excluding Qt). The core development cycle incorporates automatic testing, as well as incremental and nightly builds on all platforms, monitored using an online dashboard.

Slicer's development is managed primarily through its GitHub repository.

== External dependencies ==
- VTK
- ITK
- CMake
- CPack
- Python
- Nrrd
- MRML
- IGSTK
- Qt

== See also ==
- Analyze
- GIMIAS
- List of free and open-source software packages
- Mimics

== Notes ==
1.For a list of publications citing Slicer usage since 1998, visit: slicer.org
