= Guido Gerig =

Computer scientist

- Education: ETH Zürich
- Known for: ITK-SNAP
- Awards: AIMBE Fellow (2012); IEEE Fellow (2019)
- Scientific career
- Fields: image processing image analysis medical imaging computer vision
- Workplaces: ETH Zürich; UNC Chapel Hill; University of Utah; New York University

Guido Gerig is a computer scientist who works as a professor of computer science and engineering at the New York University Tandon School of Engineering.

== Research ==
Gerig's research supports various clinical imaging studies with image analysis methodologies related to segmentation, registration, shape analysis, and image statistics.

== Awards and honors ==
- IEEE Fellow 2019, for contributions to medical image processing
- AIMBE Fellow 2012, for outstanding research contributions to the field of three-dimensional image analysis
- MICCAI Fellow 2009, for scientific contributions to neuro-imaging and image analysis, and service to the field through conference organization and committee membership
