= ITK-SNAP =

Medical imaging software

- ITK-SNAP
- Developers: Paul A. Yushkevich, Guido Gerig, and the researchers at UPenn, UNC, Utah, and Kitware
- Release: 2004
- Written in: C++
- Platform: Cross-platform
- Available in: English
- Type: Health software
- License: GNU General Public License
- Website: http://www.itksnap.org

ITK-SNAP is an interactive software application that allows users to navigate three-dimensional medical images, manually delineate anatomical regions of interest, and perform automatic image segmentation. The software was designed with the audience of clinical and basic science researchers in mind, and emphasis has been placed on having a user-friendly interface and maintaining a limited feature set to prevent feature creep. ITK-SNAP is most frequently used to work with magnetic resonance imaging (MRI), cone-beam computed tomography (CBCT) and computed tomography (CT) data sets.

== Features ==
The purpose of the tool is to make it easy for researchers to delineate anatomical structures and regions of interest in imaging data. The set of features is kept to a minimum. The main features of the program are

Image navigation
three orthogonal cut planes through the image volume are shown at all times. The cut planes are linked by a common cursor, so that moving the cursor in one cut plane updates the other cut planes. The cursor is moved by dragging the mouse over the cut planes, making for smooth navigation. The linked cursor also works across ITK-SNAP sessions, making it possible to navigate multimodality imaging data (e.g., two MRI scans of a subject from a single session).

Manual segmentation
ITK-SNAP provides tools for manual delineation of anatomical structures in images. Labeling can take place in all three orthogonal cut planes and results can be visualized as a three-dimensional rendering. This makes it easier to ensure that the segmentation maintains reasonable shape in 3D.

Automatic segmentation
ITK-SNAP provides automatic functionality segmentation using the level-set method. This makes it possible to segment structures that appear somewhat homogeneous in medical images using very little human interaction. For example, the lateral ventricles in MRI can be segmented reliably, as can some types of tumors in CT and MRI.

ITK-SNAP is open-source software distributed under the GNU General Public License. It is written in C++ and it leverages the Insight Segmentation and Registration Toolkit (ITK) library. ITK-SNAP can read and write a variety of medical image formats, including DICOM, NIfTI, and Mayo Analyze. It also offers limited support for multi-component (e.g., diffusion tensor imaging) and multi-variate imaging data.

== Applications ==
ITK-SNAP has been applied in the following areas

- Craniofacial pathologies and anatomical studies
  - KCOT
  - Ameloblastoma
  - Cysts
  - Condyle Volumes
- Carotid artery segmentation
- Diffusion MRI Analysis
- Target definition for cancer radiotherapy
  - lung cancer radiotherapy
- Prenatal Image Analysis
  - Diagnosis of spina bifida
- Virtual reality in Medicine
- Orthodontics
- Brain morphometry
  - Corpus callosum and ventricle analysis in 22q11.2 deletion syndrome
  - Hippocampus size and shape measurement in neurodegenerative disorders.
  - Human brain tumors (e.g., Meningioma)
