= Kitware =

American technology company

- Company type: Private
- Industry: Computer software; Large Data Visualization; Biomedical Imaging; Quality Software Process; Informatics; Data Publishing; Computer Vision; Open Source
- Founded: New York (1998)
- Headquarters: Clifton Park, New York, USA
- Number of locations: Chapel Hill, North Carolina; Santa Fe, New Mexico; Minneapolis, Minnesota; Arlington, Virginia; Lyon, France
- Key people: Lisa Avila; (CEO & co-founder); Bill Hoffman; (Chairman, CTO & co-founder); Claudine Hagen; (CFO); Will Schroeder; (co-founder); Ken Martin; (co-founder); Charles Law; (co-founder); Stephen Aylward; (Senior Director of Strategic Initiatives); Berk Geveci; (Senior Director of Scientific Computing); Anthony Hoogs; (Vice President of Artificial Intelligence)
- Products: High-performance computing, visualization, and storage
- Number of employees: 195 (2024)
- Website: www.kitware.com

Kitware, Inc. is a technology company headquartered in Clifton Park, New York. The company is involved in the research and development of open-source software in the fields of computer vision, medical imaging, visualization, 3D data publishing, and technical software development.

== History ==
The company was founded in 1998 by Will Schroeder, Ken Martin, Lisa Avila, Charles Law and Bill Hoffman to support the Visualization Toolkit (VTK). VTK was initially created in 1993 by Schroeder, Martin and Bill Lorensen as companion software to “The Visualization Toolkit: An Object-Oriented Approach to 3D Graphics," originally published by Prentice-Hall. As VTK was released open source, a user community developed around the software and the founders of Kitware took this opportunity to start the business. Later, the company expanded its focus and offerings to include development in other areas such as biomedical imaging, large data visualization, quality software process, informatics, and data management.

The company has four additional offices: Carrboro, North Carolina; Minneapolis, Minnesota; Santa Fe, New Mexico; Arlington, Virginia; and Kitware SAS, the European office, in Lyon, France.

Kitware contributes to many popular open-source projects, such as VTK and CMake.
